

406001–406100 

|-bgcolor=#E9E9E9
| 406001 ||  || — || September 14, 2006 || Kitt Peak || Spacewatch || — || align=right | 1.2 km || 
|-id=002 bgcolor=#E9E9E9
| 406002 ||  || — || September 30, 2006 || Catalina || CSS || — || align=right | 1.2 km || 
|-id=003 bgcolor=#E9E9E9
| 406003 ||  || — || September 30, 2006 || Mount Lemmon || Mount Lemmon Survey || — || align=right data-sort-value="0.82" | 820 m || 
|-id=004 bgcolor=#E9E9E9
| 406004 ||  || — || September 30, 2006 || Mount Lemmon || Mount Lemmon Survey || — || align=right data-sort-value="0.94" | 940 m || 
|-id=005 bgcolor=#E9E9E9
| 406005 ||  || — || September 17, 2006 || Kitt Peak || Spacewatch || — || align=right data-sort-value="0.97" | 970 m || 
|-id=006 bgcolor=#E9E9E9
| 406006 ||  || — || September 23, 2006 || Moletai || Molėtai Obs. || MAR || align=right | 1.0 km || 
|-id=007 bgcolor=#E9E9E9
| 406007 ||  || — || September 25, 2006 || Kitt Peak || Spacewatch || (5) || align=right data-sort-value="0.81" | 810 m || 
|-id=008 bgcolor=#E9E9E9
| 406008 ||  || — || September 16, 2006 || Catalina || CSS || — || align=right | 1.1 km || 
|-id=009 bgcolor=#E9E9E9
| 406009 ||  || — || September 27, 2006 || Mount Lemmon || Mount Lemmon Survey || — || align=right | 2.2 km || 
|-id=010 bgcolor=#E9E9E9
| 406010 ||  || — || September 17, 2006 || Kitt Peak || Spacewatch || — || align=right | 1.8 km || 
|-id=011 bgcolor=#fefefe
| 406011 ||  || — || October 2, 2006 || Catalina || CSS || H || align=right data-sort-value="0.93" | 930 m || 
|-id=012 bgcolor=#E9E9E9
| 406012 ||  || — || October 14, 2006 || Piszkéstető || K. Sárneczky, Z. Kuli || — || align=right | 1.4 km || 
|-id=013 bgcolor=#E9E9E9
| 406013 ||  || — || October 11, 2006 || Kitt Peak || Spacewatch || (5) || align=right data-sort-value="0.85" | 850 m || 
|-id=014 bgcolor=#E9E9E9
| 406014 ||  || — || October 12, 2006 || Kitt Peak || Spacewatch || (5) || align=right data-sort-value="0.68" | 680 m || 
|-id=015 bgcolor=#E9E9E9
| 406015 ||  || — || September 30, 2006 || Mount Lemmon || Mount Lemmon Survey || — || align=right | 2.5 km || 
|-id=016 bgcolor=#E9E9E9
| 406016 ||  || — || October 12, 2006 || Kitt Peak || Spacewatch || — || align=right | 1.1 km || 
|-id=017 bgcolor=#E9E9E9
| 406017 ||  || — || October 12, 2006 || Kitt Peak || Spacewatch || — || align=right | 1.6 km || 
|-id=018 bgcolor=#E9E9E9
| 406018 ||  || — || September 30, 2006 || Mount Lemmon || Mount Lemmon Survey || — || align=right | 2.5 km || 
|-id=019 bgcolor=#E9E9E9
| 406019 ||  || — || September 30, 2006 || Mount Lemmon || Mount Lemmon Survey || — || align=right | 2.1 km || 
|-id=020 bgcolor=#E9E9E9
| 406020 ||  || — || October 12, 2006 || Kitt Peak || Spacewatch || — || align=right data-sort-value="0.89" | 890 m || 
|-id=021 bgcolor=#E9E9E9
| 406021 ||  || — || October 12, 2006 || Kitt Peak || Spacewatch || — || align=right | 1.4 km || 
|-id=022 bgcolor=#E9E9E9
| 406022 ||  || — || October 12, 2006 || Palomar || NEAT || — || align=right | 2.1 km || 
|-id=023 bgcolor=#E9E9E9
| 406023 ||  || — || October 10, 2006 || Palomar || NEAT || — || align=right data-sort-value="0.79" | 790 m || 
|-id=024 bgcolor=#E9E9E9
| 406024 ||  || — || October 10, 2006 || Palomar || NEAT || — || align=right data-sort-value="0.93" | 930 m || 
|-id=025 bgcolor=#E9E9E9
| 406025 ||  || — || October 11, 2006 || Palomar || NEAT || (5) || align=right data-sort-value="0.77" | 770 m || 
|-id=026 bgcolor=#E9E9E9
| 406026 ||  || — || October 11, 2006 || Palomar || NEAT || — || align=right | 2.3 km || 
|-id=027 bgcolor=#E9E9E9
| 406027 ||  || — || October 11, 2006 || Palomar || NEAT || — || align=right | 1.4 km || 
|-id=028 bgcolor=#E9E9E9
| 406028 ||  || — || October 12, 2006 || Palomar || NEAT || — || align=right data-sort-value="0.87" | 870 m || 
|-id=029 bgcolor=#E9E9E9
| 406029 ||  || — || October 2, 2006 || Mount Lemmon || Mount Lemmon Survey || — || align=right | 1.4 km || 
|-id=030 bgcolor=#E9E9E9
| 406030 ||  || — || October 2, 2006 || Mount Lemmon || Mount Lemmon Survey || — || align=right | 1.7 km || 
|-id=031 bgcolor=#E9E9E9
| 406031 ||  || — || October 13, 2006 || Kitt Peak || Spacewatch || EUN || align=right | 1.3 km || 
|-id=032 bgcolor=#E9E9E9
| 406032 ||  || — || October 13, 2006 || Kitt Peak || Spacewatch || — || align=right | 1.6 km || 
|-id=033 bgcolor=#E9E9E9
| 406033 ||  || — || October 13, 2006 || Kitt Peak || Spacewatch || (5) || align=right data-sort-value="0.74" | 740 m || 
|-id=034 bgcolor=#E9E9E9
| 406034 ||  || — || October 13, 2006 || Kitt Peak || Spacewatch || — || align=right | 1.2 km || 
|-id=035 bgcolor=#E9E9E9
| 406035 ||  || — || October 13, 2006 || Kitt Peak || Spacewatch || — || align=right | 1.5 km || 
|-id=036 bgcolor=#E9E9E9
| 406036 ||  || — || October 14, 2006 || Lulin Observatory || C.-S. Lin, Q.-z. Ye || — || align=right data-sort-value="0.93" | 930 m || 
|-id=037 bgcolor=#E9E9E9
| 406037 ||  || — || October 15, 2006 || Kitt Peak || Spacewatch || (5) || align=right data-sort-value="0.87" | 870 m || 
|-id=038 bgcolor=#E9E9E9
| 406038 ||  || — || September 14, 2006 || Kitt Peak || Spacewatch || — || align=right data-sort-value="0.90" | 900 m || 
|-id=039 bgcolor=#E9E9E9
| 406039 ||  || — || October 12, 2006 || Palomar || NEAT || (5) || align=right data-sort-value="0.77" | 770 m || 
|-id=040 bgcolor=#E9E9E9
| 406040 ||  || — || October 2, 2006 || Mount Lemmon || Mount Lemmon Survey || — || align=right | 2.0 km || 
|-id=041 bgcolor=#E9E9E9
| 406041 ||  || — || October 15, 2006 || Kitt Peak || Spacewatch || — || align=right | 2.8 km || 
|-id=042 bgcolor=#E9E9E9
| 406042 ||  || — || October 10, 2006 || Palomar || NEAT || — || align=right | 1.4 km || 
|-id=043 bgcolor=#E9E9E9
| 406043 ||  || — || October 11, 2006 || Apache Point || A. C. Becker || — || align=right | 1.6 km || 
|-id=044 bgcolor=#E9E9E9
| 406044 ||  || — || October 4, 2006 || Mount Lemmon || Mount Lemmon Survey || (5) || align=right data-sort-value="0.67" | 670 m || 
|-id=045 bgcolor=#d6d6d6
| 406045 ||  || — || October 16, 2006 || Catalina || CSS || SHU3:2 || align=right | 7.0 km || 
|-id=046 bgcolor=#E9E9E9
| 406046 ||  || — || October 16, 2006 || Catalina || CSS || MIS || align=right | 2.4 km || 
|-id=047 bgcolor=#E9E9E9
| 406047 ||  || — || October 16, 2006 || Catalina || CSS || — || align=right | 1.4 km || 
|-id=048 bgcolor=#E9E9E9
| 406048 ||  || — || October 16, 2006 || Catalina || CSS || — || align=right | 1.4 km || 
|-id=049 bgcolor=#E9E9E9
| 406049 ||  || — || October 17, 2006 || Kitt Peak || Spacewatch || critical || align=right data-sort-value="0.85" | 850 m || 
|-id=050 bgcolor=#E9E9E9
| 406050 ||  || — || October 17, 2006 || Mount Lemmon || Mount Lemmon Survey || ADE || align=right | 2.2 km || 
|-id=051 bgcolor=#E9E9E9
| 406051 ||  || — || October 16, 2006 || Kitt Peak || Spacewatch || — || align=right | 1.0 km || 
|-id=052 bgcolor=#E9E9E9
| 406052 ||  || — || October 16, 2006 || Kitt Peak || Spacewatch || — || align=right data-sort-value="0.75" | 750 m || 
|-id=053 bgcolor=#E9E9E9
| 406053 ||  || — || September 27, 2006 || Mount Lemmon || Mount Lemmon Survey || — || align=right | 1.3 km || 
|-id=054 bgcolor=#E9E9E9
| 406054 ||  || — || October 16, 2006 || Kitt Peak || Spacewatch || — || align=right data-sort-value="0.76" | 760 m || 
|-id=055 bgcolor=#E9E9E9
| 406055 ||  || — || October 16, 2006 || Kitt Peak || Spacewatch || — || align=right | 1.1 km || 
|-id=056 bgcolor=#E9E9E9
| 406056 ||  || — || October 16, 2006 || Kitt Peak || Spacewatch || — || align=right | 1.3 km || 
|-id=057 bgcolor=#E9E9E9
| 406057 ||  || — || October 16, 2006 || Kitt Peak || Spacewatch || — || align=right data-sort-value="0.65" | 650 m || 
|-id=058 bgcolor=#E9E9E9
| 406058 ||  || — || October 16, 2006 || Kitt Peak || Spacewatch ||  || align=right | 1.2 km || 
|-id=059 bgcolor=#E9E9E9
| 406059 ||  || — || October 17, 2006 || Kitt Peak || Spacewatch || — || align=right data-sort-value="0.94" | 940 m || 
|-id=060 bgcolor=#E9E9E9
| 406060 ||  || — || October 17, 2006 || Mount Lemmon || Mount Lemmon Survey || — || align=right | 1.3 km || 
|-id=061 bgcolor=#E9E9E9
| 406061 ||  || — || October 19, 2006 || Mount Lemmon || Mount Lemmon Survey || ADE || align=right | 2.6 km || 
|-id=062 bgcolor=#E9E9E9
| 406062 ||  || — || October 20, 2006 || Nyukasa || Mount Nyukasa Stn. || (5) || align=right data-sort-value="0.71" | 710 m || 
|-id=063 bgcolor=#E9E9E9
| 406063 ||  || — || October 17, 2006 || Kitt Peak || Spacewatch || — || align=right data-sort-value="0.64" | 640 m || 
|-id=064 bgcolor=#E9E9E9
| 406064 ||  || — || October 17, 2006 || Kitt Peak || Spacewatch || (5) || align=right data-sort-value="0.72" | 720 m || 
|-id=065 bgcolor=#E9E9E9
| 406065 ||  || — || October 17, 2006 || Kitt Peak || Spacewatch || — || align=right data-sort-value="0.81" | 810 m || 
|-id=066 bgcolor=#E9E9E9
| 406066 ||  || — || October 2, 2006 || Mount Lemmon || Mount Lemmon Survey || — || align=right | 1.3 km || 
|-id=067 bgcolor=#E9E9E9
| 406067 ||  || — || October 17, 2006 || Kitt Peak || Spacewatch || ADE || align=right | 2.0 km || 
|-id=068 bgcolor=#E9E9E9
| 406068 ||  || — || October 17, 2006 || Kitt Peak || Spacewatch || — || align=right | 1.4 km || 
|-id=069 bgcolor=#E9E9E9
| 406069 ||  || — || October 2, 2006 || Mount Lemmon || Mount Lemmon Survey || — || align=right | 1.3 km || 
|-id=070 bgcolor=#E9E9E9
| 406070 ||  || — || October 18, 2006 || Kitt Peak || Spacewatch || — || align=right data-sort-value="0.69" | 690 m || 
|-id=071 bgcolor=#E9E9E9
| 406071 ||  || — || October 18, 2006 || Kitt Peak || Spacewatch || — || align=right | 1.3 km || 
|-id=072 bgcolor=#E9E9E9
| 406072 ||  || — || October 18, 2006 || Kitt Peak || Spacewatch || KON || align=right | 1.7 km || 
|-id=073 bgcolor=#E9E9E9
| 406073 ||  || — || September 24, 2006 || Kitt Peak || Spacewatch || — || align=right data-sort-value="0.86" | 860 m || 
|-id=074 bgcolor=#E9E9E9
| 406074 ||  || — || October 19, 2006 || Kitt Peak || Spacewatch || — || align=right | 1.5 km || 
|-id=075 bgcolor=#E9E9E9
| 406075 ||  || — || October 19, 2006 || Kitt Peak || Spacewatch || — || align=right | 2.3 km || 
|-id=076 bgcolor=#E9E9E9
| 406076 ||  || — || October 19, 2006 || Kitt Peak || Spacewatch || EUN || align=right | 1.1 km || 
|-id=077 bgcolor=#E9E9E9
| 406077 ||  || — || October 2, 2006 || Mount Lemmon || Mount Lemmon Survey || — || align=right | 1.4 km || 
|-id=078 bgcolor=#E9E9E9
| 406078 ||  || — || October 2, 2006 || Mount Lemmon || Mount Lemmon Survey || (5) || align=right data-sort-value="0.66" | 660 m || 
|-id=079 bgcolor=#E9E9E9
| 406079 ||  || — || September 28, 2006 || Mount Lemmon || Mount Lemmon Survey || — || align=right | 1.3 km || 
|-id=080 bgcolor=#E9E9E9
| 406080 ||  || — || October 19, 2006 || Kitt Peak || Spacewatch || (5) || align=right data-sort-value="0.81" | 810 m || 
|-id=081 bgcolor=#E9E9E9
| 406081 ||  || — || October 19, 2006 || Palomar || NEAT || — || align=right data-sort-value="0.85" | 850 m || 
|-id=082 bgcolor=#E9E9E9
| 406082 ||  || — || October 19, 2006 || Kitt Peak || Spacewatch || — || align=right | 2.0 km || 
|-id=083 bgcolor=#E9E9E9
| 406083 ||  || — || October 20, 2006 || Catalina || CSS || — || align=right | 3.1 km || 
|-id=084 bgcolor=#E9E9E9
| 406084 ||  || — || October 19, 2006 || Mount Lemmon || Mount Lemmon Survey || — || align=right | 2.0 km || 
|-id=085 bgcolor=#E9E9E9
| 406085 ||  || — || October 16, 2006 || Catalina || CSS || — || align=right | 1.2 km || 
|-id=086 bgcolor=#E9E9E9
| 406086 ||  || — || October 16, 2006 || Catalina || CSS || — || align=right | 1.9 km || 
|-id=087 bgcolor=#E9E9E9
| 406087 ||  || — || October 19, 2006 || Catalina || CSS || — || align=right | 1.5 km || 
|-id=088 bgcolor=#E9E9E9
| 406088 ||  || — || October 19, 2006 || Catalina || CSS || — || align=right | 1.4 km || 
|-id=089 bgcolor=#E9E9E9
| 406089 ||  || — || October 4, 2006 || Mount Lemmon || Mount Lemmon Survey || — || align=right | 1.1 km || 
|-id=090 bgcolor=#E9E9E9
| 406090 ||  || — || October 22, 2006 || Palomar || NEAT || ADE || align=right | 2.3 km || 
|-id=091 bgcolor=#E9E9E9
| 406091 ||  || — || September 26, 2006 || Mount Lemmon || Mount Lemmon Survey || — || align=right | 1.3 km || 
|-id=092 bgcolor=#E9E9E9
| 406092 ||  || — || October 27, 2006 || Mount Lemmon || Mount Lemmon Survey || — || align=right | 1.3 km || 
|-id=093 bgcolor=#E9E9E9
| 406093 ||  || — || October 28, 2006 || Mount Lemmon || Mount Lemmon Survey || (5) || align=right | 1.7 km || 
|-id=094 bgcolor=#E9E9E9
| 406094 ||  || — || October 4, 2006 || Mount Lemmon || Mount Lemmon Survey || EUN || align=right | 1.5 km || 
|-id=095 bgcolor=#E9E9E9
| 406095 ||  || — || October 27, 2006 || Mount Lemmon || Mount Lemmon Survey || — || align=right | 1.2 km || 
|-id=096 bgcolor=#E9E9E9
| 406096 ||  || — || October 19, 2006 || Mount Lemmon || Mount Lemmon Survey || — || align=right | 1.8 km || 
|-id=097 bgcolor=#E9E9E9
| 406097 ||  || — || September 28, 2006 || Mount Lemmon || Mount Lemmon Survey || — || align=right | 1.1 km || 
|-id=098 bgcolor=#E9E9E9
| 406098 ||  || — || October 12, 2006 || Kitt Peak || Spacewatch || — || align=right | 1.4 km || 
|-id=099 bgcolor=#E9E9E9
| 406099 ||  || — || October 28, 2006 || Kitt Peak || Spacewatch || — || align=right | 1.0 km || 
|-id=100 bgcolor=#E9E9E9
| 406100 ||  || — || October 19, 2006 || Kitt Peak || M. W. Buie || — || align=right | 1.3 km || 
|}

406101–406200 

|-bgcolor=#E9E9E9
| 406101 ||  || — || October 16, 2006 || Kitt Peak || Spacewatch || — || align=right | 1.2 km || 
|-id=102 bgcolor=#E9E9E9
| 406102 ||  || — || November 9, 2006 || Kitt Peak || Spacewatch || — || align=right data-sort-value="0.93" | 930 m || 
|-id=103 bgcolor=#E9E9E9
| 406103 ||  || — || November 9, 2006 || Kitt Peak || Spacewatch || — || align=right data-sort-value="0.80" | 800 m || 
|-id=104 bgcolor=#E9E9E9
| 406104 ||  || — || November 10, 2006 || Kitt Peak || Spacewatch || — || align=right | 1.3 km || 
|-id=105 bgcolor=#E9E9E9
| 406105 ||  || — || November 11, 2006 || Catalina || CSS || (5) || align=right data-sort-value="0.87" | 870 m || 
|-id=106 bgcolor=#E9E9E9
| 406106 ||  || — || November 11, 2006 || Mount Lemmon || Mount Lemmon Survey || — || align=right | 1.4 km || 
|-id=107 bgcolor=#E9E9E9
| 406107 ||  || — || November 11, 2006 || Catalina || CSS || — || align=right | 2.2 km || 
|-id=108 bgcolor=#E9E9E9
| 406108 ||  || — || November 11, 2006 || Catalina || CSS || — || align=right | 1.8 km || 
|-id=109 bgcolor=#E9E9E9
| 406109 ||  || — || November 10, 2006 || Kitt Peak || Spacewatch || — || align=right data-sort-value="0.87" | 870 m || 
|-id=110 bgcolor=#E9E9E9
| 406110 ||  || — || November 10, 2006 || Kitt Peak || Spacewatch || — || align=right | 1.7 km || 
|-id=111 bgcolor=#E9E9E9
| 406111 ||  || — || November 10, 2006 || Kitt Peak || Spacewatch || — || align=right | 1.6 km || 
|-id=112 bgcolor=#E9E9E9
| 406112 ||  || — || November 11, 2006 || Mount Lemmon || Mount Lemmon Survey || — || align=right | 1.5 km || 
|-id=113 bgcolor=#E9E9E9
| 406113 ||  || — || October 4, 2006 || Mount Lemmon || Mount Lemmon Survey || — || align=right | 1.2 km || 
|-id=114 bgcolor=#E9E9E9
| 406114 ||  || — || October 22, 2006 || Kitt Peak || Spacewatch || — || align=right | 1.1 km || 
|-id=115 bgcolor=#E9E9E9
| 406115 ||  || — || November 13, 2006 || Kitt Peak || Spacewatch || — || align=right | 2.9 km || 
|-id=116 bgcolor=#E9E9E9
| 406116 ||  || — || September 28, 2006 || Mount Lemmon || Mount Lemmon Survey || — || align=right data-sort-value="0.89" | 890 m || 
|-id=117 bgcolor=#E9E9E9
| 406117 ||  || — || November 10, 2006 || Kitt Peak || Spacewatch || EUN || align=right | 1.6 km || 
|-id=118 bgcolor=#E9E9E9
| 406118 ||  || — || November 11, 2006 || Kitt Peak || Spacewatch || — || align=right | 1.9 km || 
|-id=119 bgcolor=#E9E9E9
| 406119 ||  || — || November 11, 2006 || Kitt Peak || Spacewatch || — || align=right | 1.8 km || 
|-id=120 bgcolor=#E9E9E9
| 406120 ||  || — || November 11, 2006 || Kitt Peak || Spacewatch || — || align=right | 1.6 km || 
|-id=121 bgcolor=#E9E9E9
| 406121 ||  || — || November 11, 2006 || Kitt Peak || Spacewatch || — || align=right | 1.5 km || 
|-id=122 bgcolor=#E9E9E9
| 406122 ||  || — || November 11, 2006 || Kitt Peak || Spacewatch || — || align=right | 1.3 km || 
|-id=123 bgcolor=#E9E9E9
| 406123 ||  || — || November 11, 2006 || Kitt Peak || Spacewatch || — || align=right data-sort-value="0.78" | 780 m || 
|-id=124 bgcolor=#E9E9E9
| 406124 ||  || — || September 27, 2006 || Mount Lemmon || Mount Lemmon Survey || — || align=right data-sort-value="0.89" | 890 m || 
|-id=125 bgcolor=#E9E9E9
| 406125 ||  || — || September 27, 2006 || Mount Lemmon || Mount Lemmon Survey || (5) || align=right data-sort-value="0.65" | 650 m || 
|-id=126 bgcolor=#E9E9E9
| 406126 ||  || — || October 31, 2006 || Mount Lemmon || Mount Lemmon Survey || (5) || align=right | 1.1 km || 
|-id=127 bgcolor=#E9E9E9
| 406127 ||  || — || November 13, 2006 || Kitt Peak || Spacewatch || — || align=right | 1.7 km || 
|-id=128 bgcolor=#E9E9E9
| 406128 ||  || — || November 13, 2006 || Kitt Peak || Spacewatch || — || align=right | 1.4 km || 
|-id=129 bgcolor=#E9E9E9
| 406129 ||  || — || November 13, 2006 || Kitt Peak || Spacewatch || (5) || align=right | 1.0 km || 
|-id=130 bgcolor=#E9E9E9
| 406130 ||  || — || November 13, 2006 || Catalina || CSS || — || align=right | 1.5 km || 
|-id=131 bgcolor=#E9E9E9
| 406131 ||  || — || November 10, 2006 || Kitt Peak || Spacewatch || MAR || align=right | 1.4 km || 
|-id=132 bgcolor=#E9E9E9
| 406132 ||  || — || October 21, 2006 || Mount Lemmon || Mount Lemmon Survey || MAR || align=right | 1.1 km || 
|-id=133 bgcolor=#E9E9E9
| 406133 ||  || — || September 27, 2006 || Mount Lemmon || Mount Lemmon Survey || — || align=right | 1.9 km || 
|-id=134 bgcolor=#E9E9E9
| 406134 ||  || — || November 12, 2006 || Lulin Observatory || H.-C. Lin, Q.-z. Ye || — || align=right | 1.7 km || 
|-id=135 bgcolor=#E9E9E9
| 406135 ||  || — || November 13, 2006 || Kitt Peak || Spacewatch || — || align=right | 1.6 km || 
|-id=136 bgcolor=#E9E9E9
| 406136 ||  || — || October 20, 2006 || Mount Lemmon || Mount Lemmon Survey || — || align=right | 1.7 km || 
|-id=137 bgcolor=#E9E9E9
| 406137 ||  || — || October 30, 2006 || Catalina || CSS || — || align=right | 1.7 km || 
|-id=138 bgcolor=#E9E9E9
| 406138 ||  || — || November 13, 2006 || Kitt Peak || Spacewatch || (5) || align=right data-sort-value="0.85" | 850 m || 
|-id=139 bgcolor=#E9E9E9
| 406139 ||  || — || November 13, 2006 || Kitt Peak || Spacewatch || JUN || align=right | 1.3 km || 
|-id=140 bgcolor=#E9E9E9
| 406140 ||  || — || October 21, 2006 || Kitt Peak || Spacewatch || — || align=right data-sort-value="0.83" | 830 m || 
|-id=141 bgcolor=#E9E9E9
| 406141 ||  || — || October 4, 2006 || Mount Lemmon || Mount Lemmon Survey || — || align=right | 1.3 km || 
|-id=142 bgcolor=#E9E9E9
| 406142 ||  || — || November 14, 2006 || Socorro || LINEAR || — || align=right | 1.4 km || 
|-id=143 bgcolor=#E9E9E9
| 406143 ||  || — || October 27, 2006 || Mount Lemmon || Mount Lemmon Survey || — || align=right data-sort-value="0.79" | 790 m || 
|-id=144 bgcolor=#E9E9E9
| 406144 ||  || — || October 23, 2006 || Kitt Peak || Spacewatch || — || align=right | 1.4 km || 
|-id=145 bgcolor=#E9E9E9
| 406145 ||  || — || November 15, 2006 || Kitt Peak || Spacewatch || — || align=right | 1.1 km || 
|-id=146 bgcolor=#E9E9E9
| 406146 ||  || — || November 15, 2006 || Catalina || CSS || — || align=right | 1.0 km || 
|-id=147 bgcolor=#E9E9E9
| 406147 ||  || — || November 15, 2006 || Kitt Peak || Spacewatch || — || align=right | 1.5 km || 
|-id=148 bgcolor=#E9E9E9
| 406148 ||  || — || November 15, 2006 || Kitt Peak || Spacewatch || — || align=right | 1.4 km || 
|-id=149 bgcolor=#E9E9E9
| 406149 ||  || — || November 9, 2006 || Palomar || NEAT || — || align=right | 2.0 km || 
|-id=150 bgcolor=#E9E9E9
| 406150 ||  || — || November 8, 2006 || Palomar || NEAT || — || align=right data-sort-value="0.98" | 980 m || 
|-id=151 bgcolor=#E9E9E9
| 406151 ||  || — || May 8, 2005 || Kitt Peak || Spacewatch || ADE || align=right | 1.8 km || 
|-id=152 bgcolor=#E9E9E9
| 406152 ||  || — || November 10, 2006 || Kitt Peak || Spacewatch || — || align=right | 1.4 km || 
|-id=153 bgcolor=#E9E9E9
| 406153 ||  || — || November 11, 2006 || Kitt Peak || Spacewatch || — || align=right | 1.2 km || 
|-id=154 bgcolor=#E9E9E9
| 406154 ||  || — || November 1, 2006 || Mount Lemmon || Mount Lemmon Survey || — || align=right data-sort-value="0.76" | 760 m || 
|-id=155 bgcolor=#E9E9E9
| 406155 ||  || — || November 8, 2006 || Palomar || NEAT || — || align=right | 1.3 km || 
|-id=156 bgcolor=#E9E9E9
| 406156 ||  || — || November 13, 2006 || Mount Lemmon || Mount Lemmon Survey || — || align=right | 3.3 km || 
|-id=157 bgcolor=#E9E9E9
| 406157 ||  || — || September 18, 2006 || Kitt Peak || Spacewatch || (5) || align=right data-sort-value="0.70" | 700 m || 
|-id=158 bgcolor=#E9E9E9
| 406158 ||  || — || November 16, 2006 || Kitt Peak || Spacewatch || (194) || align=right | 1.8 km || 
|-id=159 bgcolor=#E9E9E9
| 406159 ||  || — || October 19, 2006 || Mount Lemmon || Mount Lemmon Survey || — || align=right | 1.8 km || 
|-id=160 bgcolor=#E9E9E9
| 406160 ||  || — || November 1, 2006 || Mount Lemmon || Mount Lemmon Survey || — || align=right | 1.0 km || 
|-id=161 bgcolor=#E9E9E9
| 406161 ||  || — || November 18, 2006 || Socorro || LINEAR || — || align=right | 2.4 km || 
|-id=162 bgcolor=#E9E9E9
| 406162 ||  || — || November 16, 2006 || Kitt Peak || Spacewatch || — || align=right | 1.2 km || 
|-id=163 bgcolor=#E9E9E9
| 406163 ||  || — || October 23, 2006 || Mount Lemmon || Mount Lemmon Survey || — || align=right data-sort-value="0.91" | 910 m || 
|-id=164 bgcolor=#E9E9E9
| 406164 ||  || — || November 16, 2006 || Kitt Peak || Spacewatch || — || align=right | 1.3 km || 
|-id=165 bgcolor=#E9E9E9
| 406165 ||  || — || November 16, 2006 || Kitt Peak || Spacewatch || (5) || align=right data-sort-value="0.85" | 850 m || 
|-id=166 bgcolor=#E9E9E9
| 406166 ||  || — || November 16, 2006 || Mount Lemmon || Mount Lemmon Survey || — || align=right | 1.6 km || 
|-id=167 bgcolor=#E9E9E9
| 406167 ||  || — || November 16, 2006 || Kitt Peak || Spacewatch || — || align=right | 3.0 km || 
|-id=168 bgcolor=#E9E9E9
| 406168 ||  || — || November 16, 2006 || Kitt Peak || Spacewatch || — || align=right | 1.4 km || 
|-id=169 bgcolor=#E9E9E9
| 406169 ||  || — || November 1, 2006 || Mount Lemmon || Mount Lemmon Survey || — || align=right data-sort-value="0.79" | 790 m || 
|-id=170 bgcolor=#E9E9E9
| 406170 ||  || — || November 16, 2006 || Kitt Peak || Spacewatch || — || align=right | 2.3 km || 
|-id=171 bgcolor=#E9E9E9
| 406171 ||  || — || November 17, 2006 || Kitt Peak || Spacewatch || (5) || align=right data-sort-value="0.76" | 760 m || 
|-id=172 bgcolor=#E9E9E9
| 406172 ||  || — || October 31, 2006 || Mount Lemmon || Mount Lemmon Survey || — || align=right | 2.1 km || 
|-id=173 bgcolor=#E9E9E9
| 406173 ||  || — || October 31, 2006 || Mount Lemmon || Mount Lemmon Survey || — || align=right data-sort-value="0.94" | 940 m || 
|-id=174 bgcolor=#E9E9E9
| 406174 ||  || — || November 18, 2006 || Kitt Peak || Spacewatch || — || align=right | 1.4 km || 
|-id=175 bgcolor=#E9E9E9
| 406175 ||  || — || November 18, 2006 || Kitt Peak || Spacewatch || — || align=right | 1.2 km || 
|-id=176 bgcolor=#E9E9E9
| 406176 ||  || — || November 18, 2006 || Kitt Peak || Spacewatch || — || align=right | 3.1 km || 
|-id=177 bgcolor=#E9E9E9
| 406177 ||  || — || November 18, 2006 || Kitt Peak || Spacewatch || — || align=right | 1.2 km || 
|-id=178 bgcolor=#E9E9E9
| 406178 ||  || — || November 19, 2006 || Kitt Peak || Spacewatch || — || align=right | 1.3 km || 
|-id=179 bgcolor=#E9E9E9
| 406179 ||  || — || November 19, 2006 || Kitt Peak || Spacewatch || — || align=right | 1.3 km || 
|-id=180 bgcolor=#E9E9E9
| 406180 ||  || — || November 19, 2006 || Kitt Peak || Spacewatch || (5) || align=right data-sort-value="0.70" | 700 m || 
|-id=181 bgcolor=#E9E9E9
| 406181 ||  || — || November 19, 2006 || Catalina || CSS || — || align=right | 1.8 km || 
|-id=182 bgcolor=#E9E9E9
| 406182 ||  || — || October 22, 2006 || Catalina || CSS || — || align=right | 1.2 km || 
|-id=183 bgcolor=#E9E9E9
| 406183 ||  || — || November 19, 2006 || Catalina || CSS || — || align=right data-sort-value="0.98" | 980 m || 
|-id=184 bgcolor=#E9E9E9
| 406184 ||  || — || November 15, 2006 || Catalina || CSS || — || align=right | 1.7 km || 
|-id=185 bgcolor=#E9E9E9
| 406185 ||  || — || October 23, 2006 || Catalina || CSS || EUN || align=right | 1.5 km || 
|-id=186 bgcolor=#FA8072
| 406186 ||  || — || November 20, 2006 || Catalina || CSS || — || align=right | 1.1 km || 
|-id=187 bgcolor=#E9E9E9
| 406187 ||  || — || November 21, 2006 || Mount Lemmon || Mount Lemmon Survey || — || align=right | 1.5 km || 
|-id=188 bgcolor=#E9E9E9
| 406188 ||  || — || November 14, 2006 || Kitt Peak || Spacewatch || — || align=right | 1.1 km || 
|-id=189 bgcolor=#E9E9E9
| 406189 ||  || — || November 26, 2006 || 7300 Observatory || W. K. Y. Yeung || — || align=right | 1.4 km || 
|-id=190 bgcolor=#E9E9E9
| 406190 ||  || — || November 19, 2006 || Kitt Peak || Spacewatch || — || align=right | 1.7 km || 
|-id=191 bgcolor=#E9E9E9
| 406191 ||  || — || October 31, 2006 || Mount Lemmon || Mount Lemmon Survey || — || align=right | 1.9 km || 
|-id=192 bgcolor=#E9E9E9
| 406192 ||  || — || November 20, 2006 || Kitt Peak || Spacewatch || — || align=right | 1.5 km || 
|-id=193 bgcolor=#E9E9E9
| 406193 ||  || — || November 23, 2006 || Kitt Peak || Spacewatch || — || align=right | 1.6 km || 
|-id=194 bgcolor=#E9E9E9
| 406194 ||  || — || November 24, 2006 || Mount Lemmon || Mount Lemmon Survey || — || align=right | 1.3 km || 
|-id=195 bgcolor=#E9E9E9
| 406195 ||  || — || November 16, 2006 || Catalina || CSS || MAR || align=right | 1.2 km || 
|-id=196 bgcolor=#E9E9E9
| 406196 ||  || — || November 25, 2006 || Kitt Peak || Spacewatch || — || align=right | 2.6 km || 
|-id=197 bgcolor=#E9E9E9
| 406197 ||  || — || November 18, 2006 || Mount Lemmon || Mount Lemmon Survey || — || align=right | 1.3 km || 
|-id=198 bgcolor=#E9E9E9
| 406198 ||  || — || November 16, 2006 || Mount Lemmon || Mount Lemmon Survey || — || align=right | 2.8 km || 
|-id=199 bgcolor=#E9E9E9
| 406199 ||  || — || November 22, 2006 || Kitt Peak || Spacewatch || — || align=right data-sort-value="0.81" | 810 m || 
|-id=200 bgcolor=#E9E9E9
| 406200 ||  || — || November 22, 2006 || Socorro || LINEAR || — || align=right | 2.1 km || 
|}

406201–406300 

|-bgcolor=#E9E9E9
| 406201 ||  || — || December 10, 2006 || Kitt Peak || Spacewatch || EUN || align=right | 1.4 km || 
|-id=202 bgcolor=#E9E9E9
| 406202 ||  || — || November 27, 2006 || Mount Lemmon || Mount Lemmon Survey || — || align=right | 1.9 km || 
|-id=203 bgcolor=#E9E9E9
| 406203 ||  || — || December 12, 2006 || Mount Lemmon || Mount Lemmon Survey || — || align=right | 1.5 km || 
|-id=204 bgcolor=#E9E9E9
| 406204 ||  || — || December 11, 2006 || Kitt Peak || Spacewatch || — || align=right | 2.5 km || 
|-id=205 bgcolor=#E9E9E9
| 406205 ||  || — || September 19, 2006 || Catalina || CSS || — || align=right | 1.8 km || 
|-id=206 bgcolor=#E9E9E9
| 406206 ||  || — || November 15, 2006 || Catalina || CSS || EUN || align=right | 1.5 km || 
|-id=207 bgcolor=#E9E9E9
| 406207 ||  || — || December 12, 2006 || Palomar || NEAT || — || align=right | 1.7 km || 
|-id=208 bgcolor=#E9E9E9
| 406208 ||  || — || December 20, 2006 || Mount Lemmon || Mount Lemmon Survey || — || align=right | 1.4 km || 
|-id=209 bgcolor=#E9E9E9
| 406209 ||  || — || December 13, 2006 || Kitt Peak || Spacewatch || WIT || align=right | 1.1 km || 
|-id=210 bgcolor=#E9E9E9
| 406210 ||  || — || November 25, 2006 || Mount Lemmon || Mount Lemmon Survey || — || align=right | 1.5 km || 
|-id=211 bgcolor=#E9E9E9
| 406211 ||  || — || November 16, 2006 || Socorro || LINEAR || GAL || align=right | 1.7 km || 
|-id=212 bgcolor=#E9E9E9
| 406212 ||  || — || December 14, 2006 || Kitt Peak || Spacewatch || — || align=right | 2.8 km || 
|-id=213 bgcolor=#FFC2E0
| 406213 ||  || — || January 10, 2007 || Catalina || CSS || APOPHAcritical || align=right data-sort-value="0.31" | 310 m || 
|-id=214 bgcolor=#E9E9E9
| 406214 ||  || — || November 18, 2006 || Mount Lemmon || Mount Lemmon Survey || ADE || align=right | 2.6 km || 
|-id=215 bgcolor=#E9E9E9
| 406215 ||  || — || January 10, 2007 || Kitt Peak || Spacewatch || — || align=right | 1.3 km || 
|-id=216 bgcolor=#E9E9E9
| 406216 ||  || — || January 8, 2007 || Kitt Peak || Spacewatch || — || align=right | 1.8 km || 
|-id=217 bgcolor=#E9E9E9
| 406217 ||  || — || November 22, 2006 || Mount Lemmon || Mount Lemmon Survey || JUN || align=right | 1.2 km || 
|-id=218 bgcolor=#E9E9E9
| 406218 ||  || — || January 17, 2007 || Kitt Peak || Spacewatch || — || align=right | 1.9 km || 
|-id=219 bgcolor=#E9E9E9
| 406219 ||  || — || January 17, 2007 || Palomar || NEAT || — || align=right | 2.3 km || 
|-id=220 bgcolor=#E9E9E9
| 406220 ||  || — || December 21, 2006 || Kitt Peak || Spacewatch || — || align=right | 2.7 km || 
|-id=221 bgcolor=#FA8072
| 406221 ||  || — || January 23, 2007 || Anderson Mesa || LONEOS || — || align=right | 1.3 km || 
|-id=222 bgcolor=#E9E9E9
| 406222 ||  || — || January 24, 2007 || Catalina || CSS || — || align=right | 1.9 km || 
|-id=223 bgcolor=#E9E9E9
| 406223 ||  || — || January 17, 2007 || Mount Lemmon || Mount Lemmon Survey || — || align=right | 1.9 km || 
|-id=224 bgcolor=#E9E9E9
| 406224 ||  || — || December 24, 2006 || Mount Lemmon || Mount Lemmon Survey || — || align=right | 1.3 km || 
|-id=225 bgcolor=#E9E9E9
| 406225 ||  || — || January 24, 2007 || Mount Lemmon || Mount Lemmon Survey || — || align=right | 1.8 km || 
|-id=226 bgcolor=#E9E9E9
| 406226 ||  || — || January 24, 2007 || Mount Lemmon || Mount Lemmon Survey || — || align=right | 2.1 km || 
|-id=227 bgcolor=#E9E9E9
| 406227 ||  || — || January 24, 2007 || Mount Lemmon || Mount Lemmon Survey || — || align=right | 2.3 km || 
|-id=228 bgcolor=#E9E9E9
| 406228 ||  || — || October 23, 2006 || Mount Lemmon || Mount Lemmon Survey || — || align=right | 1.8 km || 
|-id=229 bgcolor=#E9E9E9
| 406229 ||  || — || January 24, 2007 || Catalina || CSS || — || align=right | 2.5 km || 
|-id=230 bgcolor=#E9E9E9
| 406230 ||  || — || November 1, 2006 || Kitt Peak || Spacewatch || — || align=right | 3.1 km || 
|-id=231 bgcolor=#E9E9E9
| 406231 ||  || — || January 24, 2007 || Kitt Peak || Spacewatch || — || align=right | 1.3 km || 
|-id=232 bgcolor=#E9E9E9
| 406232 ||  || — || January 24, 2007 || Mount Lemmon || Mount Lemmon Survey || — || align=right | 1.2 km || 
|-id=233 bgcolor=#d6d6d6
| 406233 ||  || — || October 25, 2005 || Kitt Peak || Spacewatch || — || align=right | 2.6 km || 
|-id=234 bgcolor=#d6d6d6
| 406234 ||  || — || January 27, 2007 || Mount Lemmon || Mount Lemmon Survey || — || align=right | 2.6 km || 
|-id=235 bgcolor=#FA8072
| 406235 ||  || — || January 25, 2007 || Socorro || LINEAR || — || align=right | 1.8 km || 
|-id=236 bgcolor=#E9E9E9
| 406236 ||  || — || January 17, 2007 || Kitt Peak || Spacewatch || HOF || align=right | 2.8 km || 
|-id=237 bgcolor=#E9E9E9
| 406237 ||  || — || November 24, 2006 || Mount Lemmon || Mount Lemmon Survey || — || align=right | 1.7 km || 
|-id=238 bgcolor=#E9E9E9
| 406238 ||  || — || November 21, 2006 || Mount Lemmon || Mount Lemmon Survey || DOR || align=right | 2.5 km || 
|-id=239 bgcolor=#E9E9E9
| 406239 ||  || — || January 27, 2007 || Kitt Peak || Spacewatch || AGN || align=right | 1.0 km || 
|-id=240 bgcolor=#d6d6d6
| 406240 ||  || — || February 10, 2007 || Mount Lemmon || Mount Lemmon Survey || — || align=right | 2.7 km || 
|-id=241 bgcolor=#E9E9E9
| 406241 ||  || — || February 8, 2007 || Palomar || NEAT || — || align=right | 1.6 km || 
|-id=242 bgcolor=#E9E9E9
| 406242 ||  || — || February 10, 2007 || Mount Lemmon || Mount Lemmon Survey || AEO || align=right | 1.1 km || 
|-id=243 bgcolor=#E9E9E9
| 406243 ||  || — || January 10, 2007 || Kitt Peak || Spacewatch || — || align=right | 3.0 km || 
|-id=244 bgcolor=#d6d6d6
| 406244 ||  || — || February 14, 2007 || Mauna Kea || Mauna Kea Obs. || — || align=right | 1.6 km || 
|-id=245 bgcolor=#E9E9E9
| 406245 ||  || — || February 16, 2007 || Črni Vrh || Črni Vrh || — || align=right | 2.4 km || 
|-id=246 bgcolor=#d6d6d6
| 406246 ||  || — || January 28, 2007 || Mount Lemmon || Mount Lemmon Survey || — || align=right | 2.2 km || 
|-id=247 bgcolor=#d6d6d6
| 406247 ||  || — || February 17, 2007 || Kitt Peak || Spacewatch || — || align=right | 2.7 km || 
|-id=248 bgcolor=#d6d6d6
| 406248 ||  || — || January 27, 2007 || Mount Lemmon || Mount Lemmon Survey || — || align=right | 2.0 km || 
|-id=249 bgcolor=#d6d6d6
| 406249 ||  || — || February 17, 2007 || Kitt Peak || Spacewatch || — || align=right | 2.8 km || 
|-id=250 bgcolor=#d6d6d6
| 406250 ||  || — || February 17, 2007 || Kitt Peak || Spacewatch || — || align=right | 2.3 km || 
|-id=251 bgcolor=#d6d6d6
| 406251 ||  || — || January 27, 2007 || Mount Lemmon || Mount Lemmon Survey || — || align=right | 3.5 km || 
|-id=252 bgcolor=#d6d6d6
| 406252 ||  || — || February 17, 2007 || Kitt Peak || Spacewatch || — || align=right | 2.6 km || 
|-id=253 bgcolor=#E9E9E9
| 406253 ||  || — || February 8, 2007 || Kitt Peak || Spacewatch || — || align=right | 2.3 km || 
|-id=254 bgcolor=#d6d6d6
| 406254 ||  || — || August 23, 2004 || Kitt Peak || Spacewatch || EOS || align=right | 2.1 km || 
|-id=255 bgcolor=#E9E9E9
| 406255 ||  || — || February 21, 2007 || Kitt Peak || Spacewatch || — || align=right | 2.5 km || 
|-id=256 bgcolor=#d6d6d6
| 406256 ||  || — || February 23, 2007 || Mount Lemmon || Mount Lemmon Survey || — || align=right | 3.5 km || 
|-id=257 bgcolor=#d6d6d6
| 406257 ||  || — || February 23, 2007 || Kitt Peak || Spacewatch || — || align=right | 2.4 km || 
|-id=258 bgcolor=#d6d6d6
| 406258 ||  || — || February 21, 2007 || Mount Lemmon || Mount Lemmon Survey || THM || align=right | 2.4 km || 
|-id=259 bgcolor=#d6d6d6
| 406259 ||  || — || November 4, 2005 || Kitt Peak || Spacewatch || KOR || align=right | 1.2 km || 
|-id=260 bgcolor=#E9E9E9
| 406260 ||  || — || February 17, 2007 || Črni Vrh || Črni Vrh || — || align=right | 1.9 km || 
|-id=261 bgcolor=#d6d6d6
| 406261 ||  || — || February 25, 2007 || Mount Lemmon || Mount Lemmon Survey || — || align=right | 3.7 km || 
|-id=262 bgcolor=#d6d6d6
| 406262 ||  || — || March 9, 2007 || Kitt Peak || Spacewatch || — || align=right | 3.1 km || 
|-id=263 bgcolor=#d6d6d6
| 406263 ||  || — || March 9, 2007 || Mount Lemmon || Mount Lemmon Survey || — || align=right | 3.4 km || 
|-id=264 bgcolor=#E9E9E9
| 406264 ||  || — || March 9, 2007 || Mount Lemmon || Mount Lemmon Survey || — || align=right | 1.7 km || 
|-id=265 bgcolor=#d6d6d6
| 406265 ||  || — || March 9, 2007 || Mount Lemmon || Mount Lemmon Survey || EOS || align=right | 1.7 km || 
|-id=266 bgcolor=#d6d6d6
| 406266 ||  || — || March 9, 2007 || Kitt Peak || Spacewatch || — || align=right | 4.0 km || 
|-id=267 bgcolor=#d6d6d6
| 406267 ||  || — || March 10, 2007 || Palomar || NEAT || EOS || align=right | 3.1 km || 
|-id=268 bgcolor=#d6d6d6
| 406268 ||  || — || March 11, 2007 || Mount Lemmon || Mount Lemmon Survey || — || align=right | 3.2 km || 
|-id=269 bgcolor=#d6d6d6
| 406269 ||  || — || January 27, 2007 || Kitt Peak || Spacewatch || — || align=right | 2.2 km || 
|-id=270 bgcolor=#d6d6d6
| 406270 ||  || — || October 4, 2004 || Kitt Peak || Spacewatch || EOS || align=right | 1.7 km || 
|-id=271 bgcolor=#d6d6d6
| 406271 ||  || — || March 10, 2007 || Kitt Peak || Spacewatch || — || align=right | 3.1 km || 
|-id=272 bgcolor=#d6d6d6
| 406272 ||  || — || February 25, 2007 || Mount Lemmon || Mount Lemmon Survey || — || align=right | 2.5 km || 
|-id=273 bgcolor=#d6d6d6
| 406273 ||  || — || March 10, 2007 || Kitt Peak || Spacewatch || — || align=right | 3.2 km || 
|-id=274 bgcolor=#d6d6d6
| 406274 ||  || — || February 26, 2007 || Mount Lemmon || Mount Lemmon Survey || — || align=right | 2.8 km || 
|-id=275 bgcolor=#d6d6d6
| 406275 ||  || — || February 26, 2007 || Mount Lemmon || Mount Lemmon Survey || EUP || align=right | 3.1 km || 
|-id=276 bgcolor=#fefefe
| 406276 ||  || — || March 11, 2007 || Kitt Peak || Spacewatch || — || align=right data-sort-value="0.67" | 670 m || 
|-id=277 bgcolor=#d6d6d6
| 406277 ||  || — || February 21, 2007 || Kitt Peak || Spacewatch || THM || align=right | 2.1 km || 
|-id=278 bgcolor=#d6d6d6
| 406278 ||  || — || March 10, 2007 || Mount Lemmon || Mount Lemmon Survey || — || align=right | 2.2 km || 
|-id=279 bgcolor=#d6d6d6
| 406279 ||  || — || March 10, 2007 || Mount Lemmon || Mount Lemmon Survey || — || align=right | 3.2 km || 
|-id=280 bgcolor=#E9E9E9
| 406280 ||  || — || March 12, 2007 || Mount Lemmon || Mount Lemmon Survey || — || align=right | 3.0 km || 
|-id=281 bgcolor=#d6d6d6
| 406281 ||  || — || March 12, 2007 || Mount Lemmon || Mount Lemmon Survey || — || align=right | 2.3 km || 
|-id=282 bgcolor=#d6d6d6
| 406282 ||  || — || March 12, 2007 || Mount Lemmon || Mount Lemmon Survey || — || align=right | 2.4 km || 
|-id=283 bgcolor=#d6d6d6
| 406283 ||  || — || March 15, 2007 || Mount Lemmon || Mount Lemmon Survey || — || align=right | 2.8 km || 
|-id=284 bgcolor=#d6d6d6
| 406284 ||  || — || March 11, 2007 || Catalina || CSS || — || align=right | 3.5 km || 
|-id=285 bgcolor=#d6d6d6
| 406285 ||  || — || March 14, 2007 || Kitt Peak || Spacewatch || — || align=right | 3.8 km || 
|-id=286 bgcolor=#d6d6d6
| 406286 ||  || — || March 13, 2007 || Kitt Peak || Spacewatch || — || align=right | 2.5 km || 
|-id=287 bgcolor=#d6d6d6
| 406287 ||  || — || February 26, 2007 || Mount Lemmon || Mount Lemmon Survey || Tj (2.96) || align=right | 3.8 km || 
|-id=288 bgcolor=#d6d6d6
| 406288 ||  || — || March 9, 2007 || Mount Lemmon || Mount Lemmon Survey || EOS || align=right | 2.1 km || 
|-id=289 bgcolor=#d6d6d6
| 406289 ||  || — || March 9, 2007 || Mount Lemmon || Mount Lemmon Survey || — || align=right | 2.5 km || 
|-id=290 bgcolor=#d6d6d6
| 406290 ||  || — || March 10, 2007 || Mount Lemmon || Mount Lemmon Survey || — || align=right | 2.6 km || 
|-id=291 bgcolor=#d6d6d6
| 406291 ||  || — || March 13, 2007 || Kitt Peak || Spacewatch || EOS || align=right | 1.7 km || 
|-id=292 bgcolor=#d6d6d6
| 406292 ||  || — || March 15, 2007 || Kitt Peak || Spacewatch || — || align=right | 2.8 km || 
|-id=293 bgcolor=#E9E9E9
| 406293 ||  || — || January 28, 2007 || Kitt Peak || Spacewatch || WIT || align=right | 1.00 km || 
|-id=294 bgcolor=#d6d6d6
| 406294 ||  || — || March 20, 2007 || Kitt Peak || Spacewatch || — || align=right | 2.4 km || 
|-id=295 bgcolor=#E9E9E9
| 406295 ||  || — || March 20, 2007 || Kitt Peak || Spacewatch || — || align=right | 2.5 km || 
|-id=296 bgcolor=#d6d6d6
| 406296 ||  || — || March 10, 2007 || Mount Lemmon || Mount Lemmon Survey || — || align=right | 2.7 km || 
|-id=297 bgcolor=#d6d6d6
| 406297 ||  || — || March 26, 2007 || Mount Lemmon || Mount Lemmon Survey || THM || align=right | 2.2 km || 
|-id=298 bgcolor=#d6d6d6
| 406298 ||  || — || March 20, 2007 || Kitt Peak || Spacewatch || — || align=right | 3.0 km || 
|-id=299 bgcolor=#fefefe
| 406299 ||  || — || April 11, 2007 || Kitt Peak || Spacewatch || — || align=right data-sort-value="0.56" | 560 m || 
|-id=300 bgcolor=#fefefe
| 406300 ||  || — || April 11, 2007 || Kitt Peak || Spacewatch || — || align=right data-sort-value="0.73" | 730 m || 
|}

406301–406400 

|-bgcolor=#d6d6d6
| 406301 ||  || — || March 26, 2007 || Catalina || CSS || TIR || align=right | 3.2 km || 
|-id=302 bgcolor=#fefefe
| 406302 ||  || — || April 14, 2007 || Kitt Peak || Spacewatch || — || align=right data-sort-value="0.53" | 530 m || 
|-id=303 bgcolor=#d6d6d6
| 406303 ||  || — || April 15, 2007 || Kitt Peak || Spacewatch || HYG || align=right | 2.5 km || 
|-id=304 bgcolor=#d6d6d6
| 406304 ||  || — || April 18, 2007 || Kitt Peak || Spacewatch || — || align=right | 2.5 km || 
|-id=305 bgcolor=#d6d6d6
| 406305 ||  || — || April 18, 2007 || Kitt Peak || Spacewatch || — || align=right | 3.0 km || 
|-id=306 bgcolor=#d6d6d6
| 406306 ||  || — || April 22, 2007 || Mount Lemmon || Mount Lemmon Survey || — || align=right | 2.8 km || 
|-id=307 bgcolor=#d6d6d6
| 406307 ||  || — || March 20, 2007 || Kitt Peak || Spacewatch || — || align=right | 3.3 km || 
|-id=308 bgcolor=#d6d6d6
| 406308 Nanwai ||  ||  || April 18, 2007 || XuYi || PMO NEO || LIX || align=right | 3.6 km || 
|-id=309 bgcolor=#d6d6d6
| 406309 ||  || — || April 24, 2007 || Kitt Peak || Spacewatch || LIX || align=right | 3.9 km || 
|-id=310 bgcolor=#fefefe
| 406310 ||  || — || April 22, 2007 || Kitt Peak || Spacewatch || — || align=right data-sort-value="0.50" | 500 m || 
|-id=311 bgcolor=#d6d6d6
| 406311 ||  || — || April 22, 2007 || Mount Lemmon || Mount Lemmon Survey || — || align=right | 3.7 km || 
|-id=312 bgcolor=#d6d6d6
| 406312 ||  || — || April 18, 2007 || Kitt Peak || Spacewatch || EOS || align=right | 2.1 km || 
|-id=313 bgcolor=#d6d6d6
| 406313 ||  || — || May 9, 2007 || Mount Lemmon || Mount Lemmon Survey || — || align=right | 4.2 km || 
|-id=314 bgcolor=#d6d6d6
| 406314 ||  || — || April 18, 2007 || Mount Lemmon || Mount Lemmon Survey || THM || align=right | 2.4 km || 
|-id=315 bgcolor=#fefefe
| 406315 ||  || — || May 10, 2007 || Kitt Peak || Spacewatch || — || align=right data-sort-value="0.61" | 610 m || 
|-id=316 bgcolor=#d6d6d6
| 406316 ||  || — || April 14, 2007 || Kitt Peak || Spacewatch || — || align=right | 4.5 km || 
|-id=317 bgcolor=#d6d6d6
| 406317 ||  || — || May 12, 2007 || Mount Lemmon || Mount Lemmon Survey || — || align=right | 3.4 km || 
|-id=318 bgcolor=#d6d6d6
| 406318 ||  || — || May 12, 2007 || Mount Lemmon || Mount Lemmon Survey || EOS || align=right | 2.8 km || 
|-id=319 bgcolor=#d6d6d6
| 406319 ||  || — || May 10, 2007 || Mount Lemmon || Mount Lemmon Survey || — || align=right | 3.3 km || 
|-id=320 bgcolor=#d6d6d6
| 406320 ||  || — || November 4, 2004 || Kitt Peak || Spacewatch || EOS || align=right | 2.4 km || 
|-id=321 bgcolor=#d6d6d6
| 406321 ||  || — || June 10, 2007 || Kitt Peak || Spacewatch || — || align=right | 4.1 km || 
|-id=322 bgcolor=#fefefe
| 406322 ||  || — || June 14, 2007 || Kitt Peak || Spacewatch || — || align=right data-sort-value="0.71" | 710 m || 
|-id=323 bgcolor=#fefefe
| 406323 ||  || — || August 4, 2007 || Bergisch Gladbach || W. Bickel || — || align=right data-sort-value="0.81" | 810 m || 
|-id=324 bgcolor=#fefefe
| 406324 ||  || — || October 7, 2004 || Kitt Peak || Spacewatch || — || align=right data-sort-value="0.74" | 740 m || 
|-id=325 bgcolor=#fefefe
| 406325 ||  || — || August 13, 2007 || Socorro || LINEAR || — || align=right | 1.0 km || 
|-id=326 bgcolor=#fefefe
| 406326 ||  || — || August 9, 2007 || Socorro || LINEAR || — || align=right data-sort-value="0.73" | 730 m || 
|-id=327 bgcolor=#fefefe
| 406327 ||  || — || August 23, 2007 || Kitt Peak || Spacewatch || — || align=right data-sort-value="0.66" | 660 m || 
|-id=328 bgcolor=#d6d6d6
| 406328 ||  || — || June 15, 2007 || Kitt Peak || Spacewatch || 7:4 || align=right | 3.2 km || 
|-id=329 bgcolor=#fefefe
| 406329 ||  || — || August 24, 2007 || Kitt Peak || Spacewatch || — || align=right data-sort-value="0.68" | 680 m || 
|-id=330 bgcolor=#fefefe
| 406330 ||  || — || September 3, 2007 || Catalina || CSS || (2076) || align=right data-sort-value="0.90" | 900 m || 
|-id=331 bgcolor=#fefefe
| 406331 ||  || — || September 11, 2007 || Remanzacco || Remanzacco Obs. || — || align=right data-sort-value="0.60" | 600 m || 
|-id=332 bgcolor=#fefefe
| 406332 ||  || — || September 5, 2007 || Mount Lemmon || Mount Lemmon Survey || — || align=right | 1.7 km || 
|-id=333 bgcolor=#fefefe
| 406333 ||  || — || September 6, 2007 || Anderson Mesa || LONEOS || — || align=right data-sort-value="0.70" | 700 m || 
|-id=334 bgcolor=#fefefe
| 406334 ||  || — || September 6, 2007 || Anderson Mesa || LONEOS || — || align=right data-sort-value="0.62" | 620 m || 
|-id=335 bgcolor=#fefefe
| 406335 ||  || — || September 8, 2007 || Anderson Mesa || LONEOS || — || align=right data-sort-value="0.85" | 850 m || 
|-id=336 bgcolor=#fefefe
| 406336 ||  || — || September 9, 2007 || Kitt Peak || Spacewatch || — || align=right data-sort-value="0.90" | 900 m || 
|-id=337 bgcolor=#fefefe
| 406337 ||  || — || September 9, 2007 || Kitt Peak || Spacewatch || — || align=right data-sort-value="0.63" | 630 m || 
|-id=338 bgcolor=#fefefe
| 406338 ||  || — || September 10, 2007 || Catalina || CSS || NYS || align=right data-sort-value="0.67" | 670 m || 
|-id=339 bgcolor=#fefefe
| 406339 ||  || — || September 10, 2007 || Mount Lemmon || Mount Lemmon Survey || — || align=right data-sort-value="0.61" | 610 m || 
|-id=340 bgcolor=#fefefe
| 406340 ||  || — || September 10, 2007 || Kitt Peak || Spacewatch || — || align=right data-sort-value="0.81" | 810 m || 
|-id=341 bgcolor=#fefefe
| 406341 ||  || — || August 24, 2007 || Kitt Peak || Spacewatch || — || align=right data-sort-value="0.62" | 620 m || 
|-id=342 bgcolor=#fefefe
| 406342 ||  || — || September 10, 2007 || Mount Lemmon || Mount Lemmon Survey || — || align=right data-sort-value="0.78" | 780 m || 
|-id=343 bgcolor=#fefefe
| 406343 ||  || — || September 10, 2007 || Kitt Peak || Spacewatch || — || align=right data-sort-value="0.85" | 850 m || 
|-id=344 bgcolor=#fefefe
| 406344 ||  || — || September 10, 2007 || Kitt Peak || Spacewatch || NYS || align=right data-sort-value="0.57" | 570 m || 
|-id=345 bgcolor=#fefefe
| 406345 ||  || — || September 11, 2007 || Mount Lemmon || Mount Lemmon Survey || — || align=right data-sort-value="0.53" | 530 m || 
|-id=346 bgcolor=#d6d6d6
| 406346 ||  || — || September 11, 2007 || Kitt Peak || Spacewatch || SHU3:2 || align=right | 5.6 km || 
|-id=347 bgcolor=#fefefe
| 406347 ||  || — || September 12, 2007 || Mount Lemmon || Mount Lemmon Survey || — || align=right data-sort-value="0.69" | 690 m || 
|-id=348 bgcolor=#fefefe
| 406348 ||  || — || September 12, 2007 || Mount Lemmon || Mount Lemmon Survey || — || align=right data-sort-value="0.73" | 730 m || 
|-id=349 bgcolor=#fefefe
| 406349 ||  || — || September 12, 2007 || Mount Lemmon || Mount Lemmon Survey || — || align=right data-sort-value="0.85" | 850 m || 
|-id=350 bgcolor=#fefefe
| 406350 ||  || — || September 13, 2007 || Socorro || LINEAR || — || align=right data-sort-value="0.94" | 940 m || 
|-id=351 bgcolor=#fefefe
| 406351 ||  || — || September 13, 2007 || Socorro || LINEAR || NYS || align=right data-sort-value="0.54" | 540 m || 
|-id=352 bgcolor=#fefefe
| 406352 ||  || — || September 15, 2007 || Vicques || M. Ory || — || align=right data-sort-value="0.80" | 800 m || 
|-id=353 bgcolor=#fefefe
| 406353 ||  || — || September 10, 2007 || Kitt Peak || Spacewatch || V || align=right data-sort-value="0.79" | 790 m || 
|-id=354 bgcolor=#fefefe
| 406354 ||  || — || September 10, 2007 || Kitt Peak || Spacewatch || — || align=right data-sort-value="0.71" | 710 m || 
|-id=355 bgcolor=#fefefe
| 406355 ||  || — || September 10, 2007 || Kitt Peak || Spacewatch || — || align=right data-sort-value="0.68" | 680 m || 
|-id=356 bgcolor=#fefefe
| 406356 ||  || — || September 10, 2007 || Mount Lemmon || Mount Lemmon Survey || — || align=right data-sort-value="0.79" | 790 m || 
|-id=357 bgcolor=#fefefe
| 406357 ||  || — || September 11, 2007 || Mount Lemmon || Mount Lemmon Survey || — || align=right data-sort-value="0.74" | 740 m || 
|-id=358 bgcolor=#fefefe
| 406358 ||  || — || September 11, 2007 || Kitt Peak || Spacewatch || — || align=right data-sort-value="0.70" | 700 m || 
|-id=359 bgcolor=#fefefe
| 406359 ||  || — || September 12, 2007 || Kitt Peak || Spacewatch || — || align=right data-sort-value="0.79" | 790 m || 
|-id=360 bgcolor=#fefefe
| 406360 ||  || — || September 12, 2007 || Kitt Peak || Spacewatch || — || align=right data-sort-value="0.71" | 710 m || 
|-id=361 bgcolor=#fefefe
| 406361 ||  || — || September 13, 2007 || Kitt Peak || Spacewatch || — || align=right data-sort-value="0.73" | 730 m || 
|-id=362 bgcolor=#fefefe
| 406362 ||  || — || September 13, 2007 || Kitt Peak || Spacewatch || — || align=right data-sort-value="0.75" | 750 m || 
|-id=363 bgcolor=#fefefe
| 406363 ||  || — || September 9, 2007 || Kitt Peak || Spacewatch || — || align=right data-sort-value="0.85" | 850 m || 
|-id=364 bgcolor=#fefefe
| 406364 ||  || — || September 11, 2007 || Kitt Peak || Spacewatch || — || align=right data-sort-value="0.79" | 790 m || 
|-id=365 bgcolor=#fefefe
| 406365 ||  || — || September 2, 2007 || Mount Lemmon || Mount Lemmon Survey || (2076) || align=right data-sort-value="0.82" | 820 m || 
|-id=366 bgcolor=#fefefe
| 406366 ||  || — || November 8, 1993 || Kitt Peak || Spacewatch || — || align=right data-sort-value="0.81" | 810 m || 
|-id=367 bgcolor=#fefefe
| 406367 ||  || — || September 13, 2007 || Anderson Mesa || LONEOS || NYS || align=right data-sort-value="0.75" | 750 m || 
|-id=368 bgcolor=#fefefe
| 406368 ||  || — || September 14, 2007 || Mount Lemmon || Mount Lemmon Survey || — || align=right data-sort-value="0.81" | 810 m || 
|-id=369 bgcolor=#fefefe
| 406369 ||  || — || August 13, 2007 || Socorro || LINEAR || — || align=right | 1.1 km || 
|-id=370 bgcolor=#fefefe
| 406370 ||  || — || September 13, 2007 || Mount Lemmon || Mount Lemmon Survey || — || align=right | 1.1 km || 
|-id=371 bgcolor=#fefefe
| 406371 ||  || — || September 15, 2007 || Mount Lemmon || Mount Lemmon Survey || — || align=right data-sort-value="0.66" | 660 m || 
|-id=372 bgcolor=#fefefe
| 406372 ||  || — || September 15, 2007 || Kitt Peak || Spacewatch || — || align=right | 1.0 km || 
|-id=373 bgcolor=#fefefe
| 406373 ||  || — || September 15, 2007 || Mount Lemmon || Mount Lemmon Survey || — || align=right data-sort-value="0.63" | 630 m || 
|-id=374 bgcolor=#fefefe
| 406374 ||  || — || September 10, 2007 || Kitt Peak || Spacewatch || — || align=right data-sort-value="0.78" | 780 m || 
|-id=375 bgcolor=#fefefe
| 406375 ||  || — || September 9, 2007 || Kitt Peak || Spacewatch || — || align=right data-sort-value="0.81" | 810 m || 
|-id=376 bgcolor=#fefefe
| 406376 ||  || — || September 8, 2007 || Mount Lemmon || Mount Lemmon Survey || — || align=right data-sort-value="0.64" | 640 m || 
|-id=377 bgcolor=#d6d6d6
| 406377 ||  || — || September 13, 2007 || Catalina || CSS || SHU3:2 || align=right | 6.5 km || 
|-id=378 bgcolor=#fefefe
| 406378 ||  || — || September 7, 2007 || Socorro || LINEAR || — || align=right | 1.6 km || 
|-id=379 bgcolor=#fefefe
| 406379 ||  || — || September 12, 2007 || Catalina || CSS || — || align=right | 1.0 km || 
|-id=380 bgcolor=#fefefe
| 406380 ||  || — || September 9, 2007 || Kitt Peak || Spacewatch || — || align=right data-sort-value="0.64" | 640 m || 
|-id=381 bgcolor=#fefefe
| 406381 ||  || — || September 12, 2007 || Mount Lemmon || Mount Lemmon Survey || — || align=right | 1.0 km || 
|-id=382 bgcolor=#fefefe
| 406382 ||  || — || September 11, 2007 || Kitt Peak || Spacewatch || — || align=right data-sort-value="0.59" | 590 m || 
|-id=383 bgcolor=#fefefe
| 406383 ||  || — || September 13, 2007 || Socorro || LINEAR || — || align=right data-sort-value="0.74" | 740 m || 
|-id=384 bgcolor=#fefefe
| 406384 ||  || — || September 12, 2007 || Catalina || CSS || V || align=right data-sort-value="0.80" | 800 m || 
|-id=385 bgcolor=#fefefe
| 406385 ||  || — || September 18, 2007 || Anderson Mesa || LONEOS || — || align=right data-sort-value="0.89" | 890 m || 
|-id=386 bgcolor=#fefefe
| 406386 ||  || — || September 21, 2007 || Bergisch Gladbac || W. Bickel || — || align=right data-sort-value="0.85" | 850 m || 
|-id=387 bgcolor=#fefefe
| 406387 ||  || — || October 30, 2000 || Socorro || LINEAR || — || align=right data-sort-value="0.79" | 790 m || 
|-id=388 bgcolor=#fefefe
| 406388 ||  || — || September 14, 2007 || Mount Lemmon || Mount Lemmon Survey || — || align=right data-sort-value="0.92" | 920 m || 
|-id=389 bgcolor=#fefefe
| 406389 ||  || — || October 5, 2007 || Pla D'Arguines || R. Ferrando || — || align=right data-sort-value="0.81" | 810 m || 
|-id=390 bgcolor=#fefefe
| 406390 ||  || — || October 6, 2007 || Socorro || LINEAR || NYS || align=right data-sort-value="0.71" | 710 m || 
|-id=391 bgcolor=#fefefe
| 406391 ||  || — || October 6, 2007 || Socorro || LINEAR || — || align=right data-sort-value="0.92" | 920 m || 
|-id=392 bgcolor=#fefefe
| 406392 ||  || — || October 4, 2007 || Kitt Peak || Spacewatch || — || align=right data-sort-value="0.85" | 850 m || 
|-id=393 bgcolor=#fefefe
| 406393 ||  || — || October 7, 2007 || Črni Vrh || Črni Vrh || — || align=right data-sort-value="0.99" | 990 m || 
|-id=394 bgcolor=#fefefe
| 406394 ||  || — || October 6, 2007 || Kitt Peak || Spacewatch || — || align=right data-sort-value="0.65" | 650 m || 
|-id=395 bgcolor=#fefefe
| 406395 ||  || — || October 4, 2007 || Catalina || CSS || — || align=right data-sort-value="0.80" | 800 m || 
|-id=396 bgcolor=#fefefe
| 406396 ||  || — || September 8, 2007 || Mount Lemmon || Mount Lemmon Survey || — || align=right data-sort-value="0.66" | 660 m || 
|-id=397 bgcolor=#fefefe
| 406397 ||  || — || October 7, 2007 || Mount Lemmon || Mount Lemmon Survey || MAS || align=right data-sort-value="0.78" | 780 m || 
|-id=398 bgcolor=#fefefe
| 406398 ||  || — || September 9, 2007 || Anderson Mesa || LONEOS || — || align=right data-sort-value="0.79" | 790 m || 
|-id=399 bgcolor=#fefefe
| 406399 ||  || — || October 14, 2007 || Altschwendt || W. Ries || — || align=right data-sort-value="0.78" | 780 m || 
|-id=400 bgcolor=#fefefe
| 406400 ||  || — || September 15, 2007 || Mount Lemmon || Mount Lemmon Survey || — || align=right data-sort-value="0.90" | 900 m || 
|}

406401–406500 

|-bgcolor=#fefefe
| 406401 ||  || — || October 6, 2007 || Kitt Peak || Spacewatch || — || align=right data-sort-value="0.76" | 760 m || 
|-id=402 bgcolor=#fefefe
| 406402 ||  || — || October 7, 2007 || Catalina || CSS || — || align=right data-sort-value="0.82" | 820 m || 
|-id=403 bgcolor=#fefefe
| 406403 ||  || — || October 8, 2007 || Mount Lemmon || Mount Lemmon Survey || MAS || align=right data-sort-value="0.66" | 660 m || 
|-id=404 bgcolor=#fefefe
| 406404 ||  || — || October 15, 2007 || Calvin-Rehoboth || Calvin–Rehoboth Obs. || NYS || align=right data-sort-value="0.55" | 550 m || 
|-id=405 bgcolor=#fefefe
| 406405 ||  || — || October 7, 2007 || Catalina || CSS || — || align=right | 1.4 km || 
|-id=406 bgcolor=#fefefe
| 406406 ||  || — || October 8, 2007 || Anderson Mesa || LONEOS || — || align=right | 1.1 km || 
|-id=407 bgcolor=#fefefe
| 406407 ||  || — || October 9, 2007 || Purple Mountain || PMO NEO || — || align=right | 1.0 km || 
|-id=408 bgcolor=#fefefe
| 406408 ||  || — || October 6, 2007 || Kitt Peak || Spacewatch || MAS || align=right data-sort-value="0.67" | 670 m || 
|-id=409 bgcolor=#fefefe
| 406409 ||  || — || October 6, 2007 || Kitt Peak || Spacewatch || NYS || align=right data-sort-value="0.58" | 580 m || 
|-id=410 bgcolor=#fefefe
| 406410 ||  || — || September 15, 2007 || Mount Lemmon || Mount Lemmon Survey || — || align=right | 1.0 km || 
|-id=411 bgcolor=#fefefe
| 406411 ||  || — || October 8, 2007 || Mount Lemmon || Mount Lemmon Survey || — || align=right data-sort-value="0.83" | 830 m || 
|-id=412 bgcolor=#fefefe
| 406412 ||  || — || October 6, 2007 || Socorro || LINEAR || — || align=right data-sort-value="0.77" | 770 m || 
|-id=413 bgcolor=#fefefe
| 406413 ||  || — || September 24, 2007 || Kitt Peak || Spacewatch || — || align=right data-sort-value="0.81" | 810 m || 
|-id=414 bgcolor=#fefefe
| 406414 ||  || — || October 9, 2007 || Socorro || LINEAR || — || align=right | 1.1 km || 
|-id=415 bgcolor=#fefefe
| 406415 ||  || — || October 8, 2007 || Catalina || CSS || — || align=right data-sort-value="0.78" | 780 m || 
|-id=416 bgcolor=#fefefe
| 406416 ||  || — || September 24, 2007 || Kitt Peak || Spacewatch || — || align=right data-sort-value="0.87" | 870 m || 
|-id=417 bgcolor=#fefefe
| 406417 ||  || — || October 9, 2007 || Socorro || LINEAR || — || align=right | 1.1 km || 
|-id=418 bgcolor=#fefefe
| 406418 ||  || — || October 6, 2007 || Kitt Peak || Spacewatch || MAS || align=right data-sort-value="0.77" | 770 m || 
|-id=419 bgcolor=#fefefe
| 406419 ||  || — || October 12, 2007 || Socorro || LINEAR || — || align=right data-sort-value="0.88" | 880 m || 
|-id=420 bgcolor=#FA8072
| 406420 ||  || — || September 27, 2007 || Mount Lemmon || Mount Lemmon Survey || — || align=right data-sort-value="0.91" | 910 m || 
|-id=421 bgcolor=#fefefe
| 406421 ||  || — || October 4, 2007 || Kitt Peak || Spacewatch || MAS || align=right data-sort-value="0.73" | 730 m || 
|-id=422 bgcolor=#fefefe
| 406422 ||  || — || October 6, 2007 || Kitt Peak || Spacewatch || — || align=right | 1.1 km || 
|-id=423 bgcolor=#fefefe
| 406423 ||  || — || October 7, 2007 || Catalina || CSS || — || align=right data-sort-value="0.94" | 940 m || 
|-id=424 bgcolor=#fefefe
| 406424 ||  || — || September 11, 2007 || Catalina || CSS || — || align=right data-sort-value="0.95" | 950 m || 
|-id=425 bgcolor=#fefefe
| 406425 ||  || — || October 8, 2007 || Mount Lemmon || Mount Lemmon Survey || — || align=right data-sort-value="0.83" | 830 m || 
|-id=426 bgcolor=#fefefe
| 406426 ||  || — || October 8, 2007 || Kitt Peak || Spacewatch || V || align=right data-sort-value="0.61" | 610 m || 
|-id=427 bgcolor=#fefefe
| 406427 ||  || — || October 10, 2007 || Mount Lemmon || Mount Lemmon Survey || — || align=right data-sort-value="0.87" | 870 m || 
|-id=428 bgcolor=#fefefe
| 406428 ||  || — || October 7, 2007 || Kitt Peak || Spacewatch || — || align=right data-sort-value="0.68" | 680 m || 
|-id=429 bgcolor=#fefefe
| 406429 ||  || — || October 7, 2007 || Kitt Peak || Spacewatch || MAS || align=right data-sort-value="0.71" | 710 m || 
|-id=430 bgcolor=#fefefe
| 406430 ||  || — || October 10, 2007 || Mount Lemmon || Mount Lemmon Survey || — || align=right data-sort-value="0.69" | 690 m || 
|-id=431 bgcolor=#fefefe
| 406431 ||  || — || October 9, 2007 || Mount Lemmon || Mount Lemmon Survey || — || align=right data-sort-value="0.63" | 630 m || 
|-id=432 bgcolor=#fefefe
| 406432 ||  || — || October 14, 2007 || Socorro || LINEAR || — || align=right data-sort-value="0.82" | 820 m || 
|-id=433 bgcolor=#fefefe
| 406433 ||  || — || October 8, 2007 || Anderson Mesa || LONEOS || — || align=right | 1.1 km || 
|-id=434 bgcolor=#fefefe
| 406434 ||  || — || October 8, 2007 || Purple Mountain || PMO NEO || — || align=right data-sort-value="0.99" | 990 m || 
|-id=435 bgcolor=#fefefe
| 406435 ||  || — || October 10, 2007 || Kitt Peak || Spacewatch || — || align=right data-sort-value="0.76" | 760 m || 
|-id=436 bgcolor=#fefefe
| 406436 ||  || — || October 10, 2007 || Kitt Peak || Spacewatch || — || align=right data-sort-value="0.62" | 620 m || 
|-id=437 bgcolor=#fefefe
| 406437 ||  || — || October 8, 2007 || Mount Lemmon || Mount Lemmon Survey || — || align=right data-sort-value="0.86" | 860 m || 
|-id=438 bgcolor=#fefefe
| 406438 ||  || — || September 11, 2007 || Mount Lemmon || Mount Lemmon Survey || NYS || align=right data-sort-value="0.58" | 580 m || 
|-id=439 bgcolor=#fefefe
| 406439 ||  || — || October 9, 2007 || Kitt Peak || Spacewatch || — || align=right data-sort-value="0.66" | 660 m || 
|-id=440 bgcolor=#fefefe
| 406440 ||  || — || September 11, 2007 || Mount Lemmon || Mount Lemmon Survey || MAS || align=right data-sort-value="0.73" | 730 m || 
|-id=441 bgcolor=#fefefe
| 406441 ||  || — || October 11, 2007 || Kitt Peak || Spacewatch || — || align=right data-sort-value="0.90" | 900 m || 
|-id=442 bgcolor=#fefefe
| 406442 ||  || — || September 29, 2003 || Kitt Peak || Spacewatch || — || align=right | 1.1 km || 
|-id=443 bgcolor=#fefefe
| 406443 ||  || — || October 15, 2007 || Kitt Peak || Spacewatch || — || align=right data-sort-value="0.71" | 710 m || 
|-id=444 bgcolor=#fefefe
| 406444 ||  || — || October 14, 2007 || Mount Lemmon || Mount Lemmon Survey || ERI || align=right | 1.5 km || 
|-id=445 bgcolor=#fefefe
| 406445 ||  || — || October 10, 2007 || Catalina || CSS || — || align=right data-sort-value="0.86" | 860 m || 
|-id=446 bgcolor=#fefefe
| 406446 ||  || — || October 11, 2007 || Catalina || CSS || — || align=right data-sort-value="0.60" | 600 m || 
|-id=447 bgcolor=#fefefe
| 406447 ||  || — || October 14, 2007 || Kitt Peak || Spacewatch || MAS || align=right data-sort-value="0.54" | 540 m || 
|-id=448 bgcolor=#fefefe
| 406448 ||  || — || October 14, 2007 || Kitt Peak || Spacewatch || V || align=right data-sort-value="0.68" | 680 m || 
|-id=449 bgcolor=#fefefe
| 406449 ||  || — || October 4, 2007 || Kitt Peak || Spacewatch || — || align=right data-sort-value="0.62" | 620 m || 
|-id=450 bgcolor=#fefefe
| 406450 ||  || — || October 10, 2007 || Catalina || CSS || — || align=right | 1.1 km || 
|-id=451 bgcolor=#d6d6d6
| 406451 ||  || — || October 15, 2007 || Catalina || CSS || 3:2 || align=right | 3.9 km || 
|-id=452 bgcolor=#fefefe
| 406452 ||  || — || October 10, 2007 || Kitt Peak || Spacewatch || — || align=right data-sort-value="0.66" | 660 m || 
|-id=453 bgcolor=#fefefe
| 406453 ||  || — || October 12, 2007 || Mount Lemmon || Mount Lemmon Survey || — || align=right data-sort-value="0.94" | 940 m || 
|-id=454 bgcolor=#fefefe
| 406454 ||  || — || October 14, 2007 || Mount Lemmon || Mount Lemmon Survey || — || align=right data-sort-value="0.86" | 860 m || 
|-id=455 bgcolor=#fefefe
| 406455 ||  || — || October 8, 2007 || Kitt Peak || Spacewatch || NYS || align=right data-sort-value="0.67" | 670 m || 
|-id=456 bgcolor=#fefefe
| 406456 ||  || — || October 10, 2007 || Catalina || CSS || — || align=right data-sort-value="0.69" | 690 m || 
|-id=457 bgcolor=#fefefe
| 406457 ||  || — || October 13, 2007 || Catalina || CSS || — || align=right data-sort-value="0.83" | 830 m || 
|-id=458 bgcolor=#fefefe
| 406458 ||  || — || October 14, 2007 || Mount Lemmon || Mount Lemmon Survey || — || align=right data-sort-value="0.80" | 800 m || 
|-id=459 bgcolor=#d6d6d6
| 406459 ||  || — || October 8, 2007 || Mount Lemmon || Mount Lemmon Survey || SHU3:2 || align=right | 5.5 km || 
|-id=460 bgcolor=#fefefe
| 406460 ||  || — || October 10, 2007 || Catalina || CSS || — || align=right | 1.8 km || 
|-id=461 bgcolor=#fefefe
| 406461 ||  || — || September 12, 2007 || Mount Lemmon || Mount Lemmon Survey || — || align=right data-sort-value="0.98" | 980 m || 
|-id=462 bgcolor=#fefefe
| 406462 ||  || — || October 17, 2007 || Anderson Mesa || LONEOS || — || align=right data-sort-value="0.83" | 830 m || 
|-id=463 bgcolor=#fefefe
| 406463 ||  || — || October 8, 2007 || Mount Lemmon || Mount Lemmon Survey || V || align=right data-sort-value="0.66" | 660 m || 
|-id=464 bgcolor=#fefefe
| 406464 ||  || — || October 16, 2007 || Kitt Peak || Spacewatch || NYS || align=right data-sort-value="0.70" | 700 m || 
|-id=465 bgcolor=#fefefe
| 406465 ||  || — || October 18, 2007 || Mount Lemmon || Mount Lemmon Survey || — || align=right data-sort-value="0.79" | 790 m || 
|-id=466 bgcolor=#fefefe
| 406466 ||  || — || October 4, 2007 || Kitt Peak || Spacewatch || — || align=right data-sort-value="0.76" | 760 m || 
|-id=467 bgcolor=#fefefe
| 406467 ||  || — || September 15, 2007 || Mount Lemmon || Mount Lemmon Survey || — || align=right data-sort-value="0.79" | 790 m || 
|-id=468 bgcolor=#fefefe
| 406468 ||  || — || September 18, 2007 || Mount Lemmon || Mount Lemmon Survey || MAS || align=right data-sort-value="0.71" | 710 m || 
|-id=469 bgcolor=#fefefe
| 406469 ||  || — || October 7, 2007 || Mount Lemmon || Mount Lemmon Survey || MAS || align=right data-sort-value="0.78" | 780 m || 
|-id=470 bgcolor=#fefefe
| 406470 ||  || — || September 13, 2007 || Mount Lemmon || Mount Lemmon Survey || NYS || align=right data-sort-value="0.55" | 550 m || 
|-id=471 bgcolor=#fefefe
| 406471 ||  || — || October 30, 2007 || Mount Lemmon || Mount Lemmon Survey || MAS || align=right data-sort-value="0.70" | 700 m || 
|-id=472 bgcolor=#fefefe
| 406472 ||  || — || October 30, 2007 || Catalina || CSS || — || align=right | 1.00 km || 
|-id=473 bgcolor=#fefefe
| 406473 ||  || — || October 4, 2007 || Kitt Peak || Spacewatch || — || align=right data-sort-value="0.63" | 630 m || 
|-id=474 bgcolor=#fefefe
| 406474 ||  || — || October 30, 2007 || Kitt Peak || Spacewatch || — || align=right data-sort-value="0.76" | 760 m || 
|-id=475 bgcolor=#fefefe
| 406475 ||  || — || October 30, 2007 || Kitt Peak || Spacewatch || — || align=right data-sort-value="0.60" | 600 m || 
|-id=476 bgcolor=#fefefe
| 406476 ||  || — || September 10, 2007 || Mount Lemmon || Mount Lemmon Survey || NYS || align=right data-sort-value="0.60" | 600 m || 
|-id=477 bgcolor=#fefefe
| 406477 ||  || — || October 30, 2007 || Mount Lemmon || Mount Lemmon Survey || — || align=right data-sort-value="0.66" | 660 m || 
|-id=478 bgcolor=#fefefe
| 406478 ||  || — || October 30, 2007 || Mount Lemmon || Mount Lemmon Survey || MAS || align=right data-sort-value="0.50" | 500 m || 
|-id=479 bgcolor=#fefefe
| 406479 ||  || — || October 7, 2007 || Kitt Peak || Spacewatch || — || align=right data-sort-value="0.74" | 740 m || 
|-id=480 bgcolor=#fefefe
| 406480 ||  || — || October 30, 2007 || Kitt Peak || Spacewatch || NYS || align=right data-sort-value="0.70" | 700 m || 
|-id=481 bgcolor=#fefefe
| 406481 ||  || — || October 30, 2007 || Mount Lemmon || Mount Lemmon Survey || — || align=right data-sort-value="0.65" | 650 m || 
|-id=482 bgcolor=#fefefe
| 406482 ||  || — || October 30, 2007 || Kitt Peak || Spacewatch || — || align=right data-sort-value="0.79" | 790 m || 
|-id=483 bgcolor=#fefefe
| 406483 ||  || — || October 14, 2007 || Mount Lemmon || Mount Lemmon Survey || — || align=right | 1.0 km || 
|-id=484 bgcolor=#fefefe
| 406484 ||  || — || October 19, 2007 || Kitt Peak || Spacewatch || — || align=right data-sort-value="0.72" | 720 m || 
|-id=485 bgcolor=#fefefe
| 406485 ||  || — || October 12, 2007 || Kitt Peak || Spacewatch || MAS || align=right data-sort-value="0.77" | 770 m || 
|-id=486 bgcolor=#fefefe
| 406486 ||  || — || October 16, 2007 || Catalina || CSS || — || align=right data-sort-value="0.90" | 900 m || 
|-id=487 bgcolor=#fefefe
| 406487 ||  || — || October 21, 2007 || Catalina || CSS || — || align=right | 1.4 km || 
|-id=488 bgcolor=#fefefe
| 406488 ||  || — || October 11, 2007 || Kitt Peak || Spacewatch || — || align=right data-sort-value="0.83" | 830 m || 
|-id=489 bgcolor=#fefefe
| 406489 ||  || — || November 1, 2007 || Kitt Peak || Spacewatch || — || align=right | 1.1 km || 
|-id=490 bgcolor=#fefefe
| 406490 ||  || — || November 4, 2007 || Kitt Peak || Spacewatch || — || align=right data-sort-value="0.75" | 750 m || 
|-id=491 bgcolor=#fefefe
| 406491 ||  || — || October 19, 2007 || Mount Lemmon || Mount Lemmon Survey || — || align=right | 1.1 km || 
|-id=492 bgcolor=#fefefe
| 406492 ||  || — || November 1, 2007 || Kitt Peak || Spacewatch || NYS || align=right data-sort-value="0.66" | 660 m || 
|-id=493 bgcolor=#fefefe
| 406493 ||  || — || November 3, 2007 || Kitt Peak || Spacewatch || — || align=right data-sort-value="0.88" | 880 m || 
|-id=494 bgcolor=#fefefe
| 406494 ||  || — || November 1, 2007 || Kitt Peak || Spacewatch || V || align=right data-sort-value="0.63" | 630 m || 
|-id=495 bgcolor=#fefefe
| 406495 ||  || — || November 1, 2007 || Kitt Peak || Spacewatch || — || align=right data-sort-value="0.81" | 810 m || 
|-id=496 bgcolor=#fefefe
| 406496 ||  || — || November 1, 2007 || Kitt Peak || Spacewatch || — || align=right | 1.1 km || 
|-id=497 bgcolor=#fefefe
| 406497 ||  || — || November 3, 2007 || Mount Lemmon || Mount Lemmon Survey || — || align=right data-sort-value="0.81" | 810 m || 
|-id=498 bgcolor=#fefefe
| 406498 ||  || — || November 3, 2007 || Kitt Peak || Spacewatch || — || align=right data-sort-value="0.70" | 700 m || 
|-id=499 bgcolor=#fefefe
| 406499 ||  || — || November 8, 2007 || Mayhill || A. Lowe || — || align=right data-sort-value="0.89" | 890 m || 
|-id=500 bgcolor=#fefefe
| 406500 ||  || — || November 2, 2007 || Kitt Peak || Spacewatch || — || align=right data-sort-value="0.77" | 770 m || 
|}

406501–406600 

|-bgcolor=#fefefe
| 406501 ||  || — || November 3, 2007 || Kitt Peak || Spacewatch || — || align=right data-sort-value="0.61" | 610 m || 
|-id=502 bgcolor=#fefefe
| 406502 ||  || — || October 13, 2007 || Catalina || CSS || — || align=right | 1.0 km || 
|-id=503 bgcolor=#fefefe
| 406503 ||  || — || November 3, 2007 || Kitt Peak || Spacewatch || NYS || align=right data-sort-value="0.42" | 420 m || 
|-id=504 bgcolor=#fefefe
| 406504 ||  || — || November 5, 2007 || Kitt Peak || Spacewatch || — || align=right data-sort-value="0.87" | 870 m || 
|-id=505 bgcolor=#fefefe
| 406505 ||  || — || October 7, 2007 || Kitt Peak || Spacewatch || NYS || align=right data-sort-value="0.65" | 650 m || 
|-id=506 bgcolor=#fefefe
| 406506 ||  || — || November 4, 2007 || Kitt Peak || Spacewatch || NYS || align=right data-sort-value="0.57" | 570 m || 
|-id=507 bgcolor=#fefefe
| 406507 ||  || — || September 14, 2007 || Mount Lemmon || Mount Lemmon Survey || — || align=right data-sort-value="0.86" | 860 m || 
|-id=508 bgcolor=#fefefe
| 406508 ||  || — || October 20, 2007 || Mount Lemmon || Mount Lemmon Survey || MAS || align=right data-sort-value="0.76" | 760 m || 
|-id=509 bgcolor=#fefefe
| 406509 ||  || — || November 7, 2007 || Kitt Peak || Spacewatch || — || align=right data-sort-value="0.74" | 740 m || 
|-id=510 bgcolor=#fefefe
| 406510 ||  || — || November 7, 2007 || Catalina || CSS || NYS || align=right data-sort-value="0.69" | 690 m || 
|-id=511 bgcolor=#E9E9E9
| 406511 ||  || — || November 7, 2007 || Mount Lemmon || Mount Lemmon Survey || — || align=right | 1.7 km || 
|-id=512 bgcolor=#fefefe
| 406512 ||  || — || September 18, 2007 || Mount Lemmon || Mount Lemmon Survey || — || align=right data-sort-value="0.70" | 700 m || 
|-id=513 bgcolor=#fefefe
| 406513 ||  || — || October 8, 2007 || Kitt Peak || Spacewatch || — || align=right data-sort-value="0.76" | 760 m || 
|-id=514 bgcolor=#E9E9E9
| 406514 ||  || — || November 4, 2007 || Mount Lemmon || Mount Lemmon Survey || — || align=right | 1.0 km || 
|-id=515 bgcolor=#fefefe
| 406515 ||  || — || November 8, 2007 || Mount Lemmon || Mount Lemmon Survey || — || align=right data-sort-value="0.79" | 790 m || 
|-id=516 bgcolor=#fefefe
| 406516 ||  || — || October 8, 2007 || Catalina || CSS || V || align=right data-sort-value="0.76" | 760 m || 
|-id=517 bgcolor=#fefefe
| 406517 ||  || — || September 26, 2007 || Mount Lemmon || Mount Lemmon Survey || — || align=right data-sort-value="0.82" | 820 m || 
|-id=518 bgcolor=#E9E9E9
| 406518 ||  || — || November 9, 2007 || Kitt Peak || Spacewatch || — || align=right data-sort-value="0.97" | 970 m || 
|-id=519 bgcolor=#fefefe
| 406519 ||  || — || November 9, 2007 || Kitt Peak || Spacewatch || — || align=right data-sort-value="0.80" | 800 m || 
|-id=520 bgcolor=#d6d6d6
| 406520 ||  || — || October 19, 2007 || Catalina || CSS || 3:2 || align=right | 5.2 km || 
|-id=521 bgcolor=#fefefe
| 406521 ||  || — || November 9, 2007 || Mount Lemmon || Mount Lemmon Survey || MAS || align=right data-sort-value="0.59" | 590 m || 
|-id=522 bgcolor=#fefefe
| 406522 ||  || — || November 9, 2007 || Mount Lemmon || Mount Lemmon Survey || — || align=right data-sort-value="0.90" | 900 m || 
|-id=523 bgcolor=#fefefe
| 406523 ||  || — || November 7, 2007 || Kitt Peak || Spacewatch || — || align=right data-sort-value="0.98" | 980 m || 
|-id=524 bgcolor=#fefefe
| 406524 ||  || — || November 7, 2007 || Kitt Peak || Spacewatch || MAS || align=right data-sort-value="0.78" | 780 m || 
|-id=525 bgcolor=#fefefe
| 406525 ||  || — || October 25, 2007 || Mount Lemmon || Mount Lemmon Survey || — || align=right data-sort-value="0.84" | 840 m || 
|-id=526 bgcolor=#fefefe
| 406526 ||  || — || November 11, 2007 || Mount Lemmon || Mount Lemmon Survey || — || align=right data-sort-value="0.72" | 720 m || 
|-id=527 bgcolor=#fefefe
| 406527 ||  || — || November 15, 2007 || Anderson Mesa || LONEOS || — || align=right data-sort-value="0.79" | 790 m || 
|-id=528 bgcolor=#fefefe
| 406528 ||  || — || October 20, 2007 || Mount Lemmon || Mount Lemmon Survey || — || align=right data-sort-value="0.68" | 680 m || 
|-id=529 bgcolor=#fefefe
| 406529 ||  || — || November 13, 2007 || Mount Lemmon || Mount Lemmon Survey || V || align=right data-sort-value="0.72" | 720 m || 
|-id=530 bgcolor=#E9E9E9
| 406530 ||  || — || November 1, 2007 || Kitt Peak || Spacewatch || — || align=right | 1.2 km || 
|-id=531 bgcolor=#fefefe
| 406531 ||  || — || November 5, 2007 || Mount Lemmon || Mount Lemmon Survey || — || align=right data-sort-value="0.86" | 860 m || 
|-id=532 bgcolor=#fefefe
| 406532 ||  || — || November 7, 2007 || Kitt Peak || Spacewatch || — || align=right data-sort-value="0.57" | 570 m || 
|-id=533 bgcolor=#fefefe
| 406533 ||  || — || November 5, 2007 || Purple Mountain || PMO NEO || NYS || align=right data-sort-value="0.71" | 710 m || 
|-id=534 bgcolor=#E9E9E9
| 406534 ||  || — || November 6, 2007 || Kitt Peak || Spacewatch || — || align=right | 1.00 km || 
|-id=535 bgcolor=#fefefe
| 406535 ||  || — || November 4, 2007 || Kitt Peak || Spacewatch || — || align=right data-sort-value="0.91" | 910 m || 
|-id=536 bgcolor=#fefefe
| 406536 ||  || — || November 7, 2007 || Kitt Peak || Spacewatch || — || align=right data-sort-value="0.85" | 850 m || 
|-id=537 bgcolor=#fefefe
| 406537 ||  || — || November 2, 2007 || Kitt Peak || Spacewatch || — || align=right data-sort-value="0.64" | 640 m || 
|-id=538 bgcolor=#fefefe
| 406538 ||  || — || November 6, 2007 || Kitt Peak || Spacewatch || — || align=right data-sort-value="0.62" | 620 m || 
|-id=539 bgcolor=#E9E9E9
| 406539 ||  || — || November 7, 2007 || Mount Lemmon || Mount Lemmon Survey || — || align=right | 1.1 km || 
|-id=540 bgcolor=#fefefe
| 406540 ||  || — || November 8, 2007 || Mount Lemmon || Mount Lemmon Survey || — || align=right | 1.3 km || 
|-id=541 bgcolor=#fefefe
| 406541 ||  || — || November 11, 2007 || Socorro || LINEAR || — || align=right data-sort-value="0.86" | 860 m || 
|-id=542 bgcolor=#fefefe
| 406542 ||  || — || November 18, 2007 || Bisei SG Center || BATTeRS || NYS || align=right data-sort-value="0.66" | 660 m || 
|-id=543 bgcolor=#fefefe
| 406543 ||  || — || November 18, 2007 || Socorro || LINEAR || — || align=right data-sort-value="0.91" | 910 m || 
|-id=544 bgcolor=#fefefe
| 406544 ||  || — || October 12, 2007 || Kitt Peak || Spacewatch || NYS || align=right data-sort-value="0.54" | 540 m || 
|-id=545 bgcolor=#fefefe
| 406545 ||  || — || September 15, 2007 || Mount Lemmon || Mount Lemmon Survey || NYS || align=right data-sort-value="0.77" | 770 m || 
|-id=546 bgcolor=#fefefe
| 406546 ||  || — || November 2, 2007 || Kitt Peak || Spacewatch || — || align=right data-sort-value="0.82" | 820 m || 
|-id=547 bgcolor=#fefefe
| 406547 ||  || — || November 19, 2007 || Mount Lemmon || Mount Lemmon Survey || — || align=right data-sort-value="0.78" | 780 m || 
|-id=548 bgcolor=#E9E9E9
| 406548 ||  || — || November 19, 2007 || Mount Lemmon || Mount Lemmon Survey || — || align=right | 1.1 km || 
|-id=549 bgcolor=#E9E9E9
| 406549 ||  || — || November 20, 2007 || Mount Lemmon || Mount Lemmon Survey || — || align=right | 2.1 km || 
|-id=550 bgcolor=#fefefe
| 406550 ||  || — || December 11, 2007 || Saint-Sulpice || B. Christophe || — || align=right | 1.1 km || 
|-id=551 bgcolor=#fefefe
| 406551 ||  || — || December 4, 2007 || Mount Lemmon || Mount Lemmon Survey || MAS || align=right data-sort-value="0.71" | 710 m || 
|-id=552 bgcolor=#fefefe
| 406552 ||  || — || December 6, 2007 || Kitt Peak || Spacewatch || — || align=right data-sort-value="0.87" | 870 m || 
|-id=553 bgcolor=#fefefe
| 406553 ||  || — || December 16, 2007 || Catalina || CSS || — || align=right data-sort-value="0.87" | 870 m || 
|-id=554 bgcolor=#fefefe
| 406554 ||  || — || December 16, 2007 || Mount Lemmon || Mount Lemmon Survey || — || align=right data-sort-value="0.94" | 940 m || 
|-id=555 bgcolor=#E9E9E9
| 406555 ||  || — || December 16, 2007 || Kitt Peak || Spacewatch || — || align=right data-sort-value="0.90" | 900 m || 
|-id=556 bgcolor=#E9E9E9
| 406556 ||  || — || December 18, 2007 || Mount Lemmon || Mount Lemmon Survey || — || align=right data-sort-value="0.90" | 900 m || 
|-id=557 bgcolor=#fefefe
| 406557 ||  || — || November 4, 2007 || Mount Lemmon || Mount Lemmon Survey || — || align=right data-sort-value="0.83" | 830 m || 
|-id=558 bgcolor=#E9E9E9
| 406558 ||  || — || December 30, 2007 || Mount Lemmon || Mount Lemmon Survey || — || align=right | 1.4 km || 
|-id=559 bgcolor=#E9E9E9
| 406559 ||  || — || December 28, 2007 || Kitt Peak || Spacewatch || EUN || align=right | 1.7 km || 
|-id=560 bgcolor=#fefefe
| 406560 ||  || — || December 28, 2007 || Kitt Peak || Spacewatch || — || align=right | 2.0 km || 
|-id=561 bgcolor=#fefefe
| 406561 ||  || — || November 2, 2007 || Mount Lemmon || Mount Lemmon Survey || — || align=right | 1.2 km || 
|-id=562 bgcolor=#FA8072
| 406562 ||  || — || December 19, 2007 || Catalina || CSS || PHO || align=right | 1.2 km || 
|-id=563 bgcolor=#E9E9E9
| 406563 ||  || — || December 18, 2007 || Mount Lemmon || Mount Lemmon Survey || — || align=right | 1.2 km || 
|-id=564 bgcolor=#fefefe
| 406564 ||  || — || December 17, 2007 || Mount Lemmon || Mount Lemmon Survey || — || align=right | 1.0 km || 
|-id=565 bgcolor=#E9E9E9
| 406565 ||  || — || December 30, 2007 || Kitt Peak || Spacewatch || — || align=right data-sort-value="0.72" | 720 m || 
|-id=566 bgcolor=#E9E9E9
| 406566 ||  || — || December 30, 2007 || Mount Lemmon || Mount Lemmon Survey || — || align=right data-sort-value="0.89" | 890 m || 
|-id=567 bgcolor=#E9E9E9
| 406567 ||  || — || December 17, 2007 || Mount Lemmon || Mount Lemmon Survey || MAR || align=right | 1.1 km || 
|-id=568 bgcolor=#E9E9E9
| 406568 ||  || — || December 30, 2007 || Mount Lemmon || Mount Lemmon Survey || — || align=right | 1.2 km || 
|-id=569 bgcolor=#fefefe
| 406569 ||  || — || December 30, 2007 || Kitt Peak || Spacewatch || MAS || align=right data-sort-value="0.88" | 880 m || 
|-id=570 bgcolor=#E9E9E9
| 406570 ||  || — || December 17, 2007 || Mount Lemmon || Mount Lemmon Survey || — || align=right | 2.7 km || 
|-id=571 bgcolor=#d6d6d6
| 406571 ||  || — || January 10, 2008 || Mount Lemmon || Mount Lemmon Survey || 3:2 || align=right | 5.4 km || 
|-id=572 bgcolor=#E9E9E9
| 406572 ||  || — || January 10, 2008 || Mount Lemmon || Mount Lemmon Survey || — || align=right | 1.3 km || 
|-id=573 bgcolor=#E9E9E9
| 406573 ||  || — || January 10, 2008 || Kitt Peak || Spacewatch || — || align=right | 1.8 km || 
|-id=574 bgcolor=#E9E9E9
| 406574 ||  || — || January 10, 2008 || Mount Lemmon || Mount Lemmon Survey || — || align=right | 1.8 km || 
|-id=575 bgcolor=#E9E9E9
| 406575 ||  || — || January 10, 2008 || Mount Lemmon || Mount Lemmon Survey || — || align=right | 1.4 km || 
|-id=576 bgcolor=#fefefe
| 406576 ||  || — || December 31, 2007 || Catalina || CSS || — || align=right | 1.1 km || 
|-id=577 bgcolor=#E9E9E9
| 406577 ||  || — || January 10, 2008 || Mount Lemmon || Mount Lemmon Survey || — || align=right | 1.5 km || 
|-id=578 bgcolor=#fefefe
| 406578 ||  || — || December 4, 2007 || Mount Lemmon || Mount Lemmon Survey || MAS || align=right data-sort-value="0.79" | 790 m || 
|-id=579 bgcolor=#E9E9E9
| 406579 ||  || — || December 30, 2007 || Kitt Peak || Spacewatch || — || align=right | 1.7 km || 
|-id=580 bgcolor=#E9E9E9
| 406580 ||  || — || January 12, 2008 || Kitt Peak || Spacewatch || — || align=right | 3.0 km || 
|-id=581 bgcolor=#fefefe
| 406581 ||  || — || January 12, 2008 || Kitt Peak || Spacewatch || — || align=right | 2.1 km || 
|-id=582 bgcolor=#E9E9E9
| 406582 ||  || — || January 12, 2008 || Kitt Peak || Spacewatch || — || align=right | 1.4 km || 
|-id=583 bgcolor=#fefefe
| 406583 ||  || — || January 13, 2008 || Kitt Peak || Spacewatch || — || align=right data-sort-value="0.84" | 840 m || 
|-id=584 bgcolor=#E9E9E9
| 406584 ||  || — || January 13, 2008 || Kitt Peak || Spacewatch || (5) || align=right data-sort-value="0.85" | 850 m || 
|-id=585 bgcolor=#E9E9E9
| 406585 ||  || — || January 14, 2008 || Kitt Peak || Spacewatch || — || align=right | 2.4 km || 
|-id=586 bgcolor=#fefefe
| 406586 ||  || — || January 14, 2008 || Kitt Peak || Spacewatch || — || align=right data-sort-value="0.69" | 690 m || 
|-id=587 bgcolor=#fefefe
| 406587 ||  || — || December 28, 2007 || Kitt Peak || Spacewatch || — || align=right data-sort-value="0.74" | 740 m || 
|-id=588 bgcolor=#E9E9E9
| 406588 ||  || — || May 11, 1996 || Kitt Peak || Spacewatch || — || align=right | 1.5 km || 
|-id=589 bgcolor=#fefefe
| 406589 ||  || — || December 19, 2003 || Socorro || LINEAR || NYS || align=right data-sort-value="0.74" | 740 m || 
|-id=590 bgcolor=#E9E9E9
| 406590 ||  || — || January 19, 2008 || Kitt Peak || Spacewatch || EUN || align=right | 1.3 km || 
|-id=591 bgcolor=#E9E9E9
| 406591 ||  || — || December 30, 2007 || Mount Lemmon || Mount Lemmon Survey || — || align=right | 1.7 km || 
|-id=592 bgcolor=#E9E9E9
| 406592 ||  || — || January 10, 2008 || Kitt Peak || Spacewatch || — || align=right data-sort-value="0.94" | 940 m || 
|-id=593 bgcolor=#E9E9E9
| 406593 ||  || — || January 30, 2008 || Kitt Peak || Spacewatch || — || align=right | 1.6 km || 
|-id=594 bgcolor=#E9E9E9
| 406594 ||  || — || November 18, 2007 || Mount Lemmon || Mount Lemmon Survey || — || align=right | 1.2 km || 
|-id=595 bgcolor=#E9E9E9
| 406595 ||  || — || January 30, 2008 || Mount Lemmon || Mount Lemmon Survey || — || align=right | 1.2 km || 
|-id=596 bgcolor=#E9E9E9
| 406596 ||  || — || February 1, 2008 || Mount Lemmon || Mount Lemmon Survey || — || align=right | 2.4 km || 
|-id=597 bgcolor=#E9E9E9
| 406597 ||  || — || February 2, 2008 || Kitt Peak || Spacewatch || — || align=right | 1.5 km || 
|-id=598 bgcolor=#E9E9E9
| 406598 ||  || — || January 10, 2008 || Kitt Peak || Spacewatch || — || align=right | 2.1 km || 
|-id=599 bgcolor=#E9E9E9
| 406599 ||  || — || January 10, 2008 || Mount Lemmon || Mount Lemmon Survey || — || align=right | 1.5 km || 
|-id=600 bgcolor=#E9E9E9
| 406600 ||  || — || February 1, 2008 || Kitt Peak || Spacewatch || — || align=right | 1.5 km || 
|}

406601–406700 

|-bgcolor=#fefefe
| 406601 ||  || — || February 2, 2008 || Kitt Peak || Spacewatch || — || align=right | 1.1 km || 
|-id=602 bgcolor=#E9E9E9
| 406602 ||  || — || February 2, 2008 || Kitt Peak || Spacewatch || HNS || align=right data-sort-value="0.96" | 960 m || 
|-id=603 bgcolor=#E9E9E9
| 406603 ||  || — || February 2, 2008 || Kitt Peak || Spacewatch || — || align=right | 2.1 km || 
|-id=604 bgcolor=#E9E9E9
| 406604 ||  || — || February 2, 2008 || Kitt Peak || Spacewatch || — || align=right | 1.5 km || 
|-id=605 bgcolor=#fefefe
| 406605 ||  || — || February 3, 2008 || Catalina || CSS || — || align=right | 1.3 km || 
|-id=606 bgcolor=#E9E9E9
| 406606 ||  || — || January 18, 2008 || Kitt Peak || Spacewatch || — || align=right | 1.8 km || 
|-id=607 bgcolor=#E9E9E9
| 406607 ||  || — || February 7, 2008 || Mount Lemmon || Mount Lemmon Survey || — || align=right | 1.4 km || 
|-id=608 bgcolor=#fefefe
| 406608 ||  || — || February 7, 2008 || Kitt Peak || Spacewatch || — || align=right data-sort-value="0.98" | 980 m || 
|-id=609 bgcolor=#E9E9E9
| 406609 ||  || — || February 7, 2008 || Kitt Peak || Spacewatch || — || align=right | 1.3 km || 
|-id=610 bgcolor=#E9E9E9
| 406610 ||  || — || October 3, 2006 || Mount Lemmon || Mount Lemmon Survey || — || align=right | 1.3 km || 
|-id=611 bgcolor=#E9E9E9
| 406611 ||  || — || February 8, 2008 || Kitt Peak || Spacewatch || HNS || align=right | 1.1 km || 
|-id=612 bgcolor=#E9E9E9
| 406612 ||  || — || February 8, 2008 || Kitt Peak || Spacewatch || — || align=right | 1.5 km || 
|-id=613 bgcolor=#E9E9E9
| 406613 ||  || — || February 10, 2008 || Altschwendt || W. Ries || — || align=right | 1.8 km || 
|-id=614 bgcolor=#E9E9E9
| 406614 ||  || — || February 7, 2008 || Kitt Peak || Spacewatch || EUN || align=right | 1.3 km || 
|-id=615 bgcolor=#E9E9E9
| 406615 ||  || — || February 8, 2008 || Kitt Peak || Spacewatch || — || align=right | 2.3 km || 
|-id=616 bgcolor=#E9E9E9
| 406616 ||  || — || November 7, 2007 || Mount Lemmon || Mount Lemmon Survey || — || align=right | 1.1 km || 
|-id=617 bgcolor=#E9E9E9
| 406617 ||  || — || February 9, 2008 || Kitt Peak || Spacewatch || — || align=right | 1.4 km || 
|-id=618 bgcolor=#E9E9E9
| 406618 ||  || — || January 11, 2008 || Kitt Peak || Spacewatch || NEM || align=right | 2.4 km || 
|-id=619 bgcolor=#E9E9E9
| 406619 ||  || — || December 30, 2007 || Mount Lemmon || Mount Lemmon Survey || EUN || align=right | 1.1 km || 
|-id=620 bgcolor=#E9E9E9
| 406620 ||  || — || February 7, 2008 || Catalina || CSS || — || align=right | 1.5 km || 
|-id=621 bgcolor=#E9E9E9
| 406621 ||  || — || February 8, 2008 || Kitt Peak || Spacewatch || — || align=right | 1.6 km || 
|-id=622 bgcolor=#E9E9E9
| 406622 ||  || — || February 8, 2008 || Kitt Peak || Spacewatch || — || align=right | 1.6 km || 
|-id=623 bgcolor=#E9E9E9
| 406623 ||  || — || February 8, 2008 || Kitt Peak || Spacewatch || — || align=right | 2.9 km || 
|-id=624 bgcolor=#E9E9E9
| 406624 ||  || — || February 8, 2008 || Kitt Peak || Spacewatch || — || align=right | 2.1 km || 
|-id=625 bgcolor=#E9E9E9
| 406625 ||  || — || October 2, 2006 || Mount Lemmon || Mount Lemmon Survey || — || align=right | 1.4 km || 
|-id=626 bgcolor=#E9E9E9
| 406626 ||  || — || December 20, 2007 || Mount Lemmon || Mount Lemmon Survey || — || align=right | 1.8 km || 
|-id=627 bgcolor=#E9E9E9
| 406627 ||  || — || February 1, 2008 || Kitt Peak || Spacewatch || — || align=right | 1.2 km || 
|-id=628 bgcolor=#E9E9E9
| 406628 ||  || — || February 9, 2008 || Mount Lemmon || Mount Lemmon Survey || — || align=right | 2.1 km || 
|-id=629 bgcolor=#E9E9E9
| 406629 ||  || — || February 10, 2008 || Kitt Peak || Spacewatch || — || align=right | 1.3 km || 
|-id=630 bgcolor=#E9E9E9
| 406630 ||  || — || February 12, 2008 || Mount Lemmon || Mount Lemmon Survey || NEM || align=right | 2.0 km || 
|-id=631 bgcolor=#E9E9E9
| 406631 ||  || — || February 6, 2008 || Catalina || CSS || — || align=right | 4.8 km || 
|-id=632 bgcolor=#E9E9E9
| 406632 ||  || — || February 9, 2008 || Catalina || CSS || — || align=right | 2.8 km || 
|-id=633 bgcolor=#fefefe
| 406633 ||  || — || November 11, 2007 || Mount Lemmon || Mount Lemmon Survey || H || align=right data-sort-value="0.74" | 740 m || 
|-id=634 bgcolor=#E9E9E9
| 406634 ||  || — || January 18, 2008 || Mount Lemmon || Mount Lemmon Survey || — || align=right | 4.4 km || 
|-id=635 bgcolor=#E9E9E9
| 406635 ||  || — || February 2, 2008 || Kitt Peak || Spacewatch || — || align=right | 1.9 km || 
|-id=636 bgcolor=#E9E9E9
| 406636 ||  || — || February 9, 2008 || Kitt Peak || Spacewatch || MAR || align=right | 1.1 km || 
|-id=637 bgcolor=#E9E9E9
| 406637 ||  || — || February 13, 2008 || Kitt Peak || Spacewatch || — || align=right | 1.3 km || 
|-id=638 bgcolor=#E9E9E9
| 406638 ||  || — || February 3, 2008 || Kitt Peak || Spacewatch || — || align=right | 1.5 km || 
|-id=639 bgcolor=#E9E9E9
| 406639 ||  || — || February 8, 2008 || Kitt Peak || Spacewatch || NEM || align=right | 2.4 km || 
|-id=640 bgcolor=#E9E9E9
| 406640 ||  || — || February 7, 2008 || Kitt Peak || Spacewatch || — || align=right | 2.2 km || 
|-id=641 bgcolor=#E9E9E9
| 406641 ||  || — || February 9, 2008 || Mount Lemmon || Mount Lemmon Survey || — || align=right | 2.0 km || 
|-id=642 bgcolor=#fefefe
| 406642 ||  || — || February 24, 2008 || Kitt Peak || Spacewatch || — || align=right data-sort-value="0.69" | 690 m || 
|-id=643 bgcolor=#E9E9E9
| 406643 ||  || — || February 24, 2008 || Kitt Peak || Spacewatch || HNS || align=right | 1.3 km || 
|-id=644 bgcolor=#E9E9E9
| 406644 ||  || — || February 27, 2008 || Mount Lemmon || Mount Lemmon Survey || — || align=right | 2.4 km || 
|-id=645 bgcolor=#E9E9E9
| 406645 ||  || — || February 28, 2008 || Kitt Peak || Spacewatch || — || align=right | 1.8 km || 
|-id=646 bgcolor=#E9E9E9
| 406646 ||  || — || February 13, 2008 || Socorro || LINEAR || — || align=right | 1.9 km || 
|-id=647 bgcolor=#E9E9E9
| 406647 ||  || — || February 28, 2008 || Kitt Peak || Spacewatch || — || align=right | 2.0 km || 
|-id=648 bgcolor=#E9E9E9
| 406648 ||  || — || February 27, 2008 || Mount Lemmon || Mount Lemmon Survey || — || align=right | 1.7 km || 
|-id=649 bgcolor=#E9E9E9
| 406649 ||  || — || February 27, 2008 || Mount Lemmon || Mount Lemmon Survey || — || align=right | 1.9 km || 
|-id=650 bgcolor=#E9E9E9
| 406650 ||  || — || February 26, 2008 || Socorro || LINEAR || HNS || align=right | 1.5 km || 
|-id=651 bgcolor=#fefefe
| 406651 ||  || — || February 27, 2008 || Kitt Peak || Spacewatch || H || align=right data-sort-value="0.59" | 590 m || 
|-id=652 bgcolor=#FA8072
| 406652 ||  || — || February 27, 2008 || Mount Lemmon || Mount Lemmon Survey || H || align=right data-sort-value="0.72" | 720 m || 
|-id=653 bgcolor=#E9E9E9
| 406653 ||  || — || February 11, 2008 || Mount Lemmon || Mount Lemmon Survey || JUN || align=right | 1.1 km || 
|-id=654 bgcolor=#E9E9E9
| 406654 ||  || — || February 7, 2008 || Kitt Peak || Spacewatch || — || align=right data-sort-value="0.88" | 880 m || 
|-id=655 bgcolor=#E9E9E9
| 406655 ||  || — || February 7, 2008 || Mount Lemmon || Mount Lemmon Survey || — || align=right | 1.6 km || 
|-id=656 bgcolor=#E9E9E9
| 406656 ||  || — || February 1, 2008 || Kitt Peak || Spacewatch || — || align=right | 1.5 km || 
|-id=657 bgcolor=#E9E9E9
| 406657 ||  || — || February 10, 2008 || Kitt Peak || Spacewatch || — || align=right | 1.9 km || 
|-id=658 bgcolor=#E9E9E9
| 406658 ||  || — || February 28, 2008 || Catalina || CSS || KON || align=right | 2.5 km || 
|-id=659 bgcolor=#E9E9E9
| 406659 ||  || — || March 1, 2008 || Kitt Peak || Spacewatch || EUN || align=right | 1.3 km || 
|-id=660 bgcolor=#d6d6d6
| 406660 ||  || — || March 1, 2008 || Kitt Peak || Spacewatch || BRA || align=right | 2.0 km || 
|-id=661 bgcolor=#E9E9E9
| 406661 ||  || — || March 2, 2008 || Kitt Peak || Spacewatch || EUN || align=right | 1.1 km || 
|-id=662 bgcolor=#E9E9E9
| 406662 ||  || — || March 2, 2008 || Purple Mountain || PMO NEO || — || align=right | 1.0 km || 
|-id=663 bgcolor=#E9E9E9
| 406663 ||  || — || February 8, 2008 || Mount Lemmon || Mount Lemmon Survey || — || align=right | 1.6 km || 
|-id=664 bgcolor=#E9E9E9
| 406664 ||  || — || March 5, 2008 || Kitt Peak || Spacewatch || (5) || align=right | 1.1 km || 
|-id=665 bgcolor=#E9E9E9
| 406665 ||  || — || March 5, 2008 || Mount Lemmon || Mount Lemmon Survey || — || align=right | 2.5 km || 
|-id=666 bgcolor=#d6d6d6
| 406666 ||  || — || February 27, 2008 || Kitt Peak || Spacewatch || — || align=right | 3.2 km || 
|-id=667 bgcolor=#E9E9E9
| 406667 ||  || — || March 7, 2008 || Catalina || CSS || — || align=right | 2.1 km || 
|-id=668 bgcolor=#E9E9E9
| 406668 ||  || — || March 7, 2008 || Kitt Peak || Spacewatch || JUN || align=right | 1.0 km || 
|-id=669 bgcolor=#E9E9E9
| 406669 ||  || — || March 8, 2008 || Catalina || CSS || — || align=right | 3.1 km || 
|-id=670 bgcolor=#E9E9E9
| 406670 ||  || — || March 8, 2008 || Kitt Peak || Spacewatch || EUN || align=right data-sort-value="0.85" | 850 m || 
|-id=671 bgcolor=#E9E9E9
| 406671 ||  || — || March 7, 2008 || Kitt Peak || Spacewatch || — || align=right | 2.0 km || 
|-id=672 bgcolor=#E9E9E9
| 406672 ||  || — || March 10, 2008 || Mount Lemmon || Mount Lemmon Survey || — || align=right | 3.1 km || 
|-id=673 bgcolor=#E9E9E9
| 406673 ||  || — || December 16, 2007 || Mount Lemmon || Mount Lemmon Survey || — || align=right | 1.1 km || 
|-id=674 bgcolor=#E9E9E9
| 406674 ||  || — || March 6, 2008 || Mount Lemmon || Mount Lemmon Survey || — || align=right | 2.4 km || 
|-id=675 bgcolor=#E9E9E9
| 406675 ||  || — || March 4, 2008 || Catalina || CSS || — || align=right | 2.2 km || 
|-id=676 bgcolor=#E9E9E9
| 406676 ||  || — || February 11, 2008 || Mount Lemmon || Mount Lemmon Survey || — || align=right | 2.8 km || 
|-id=677 bgcolor=#E9E9E9
| 406677 ||  || — || March 8, 2008 || Mount Lemmon || Mount Lemmon Survey || — || align=right | 2.3 km || 
|-id=678 bgcolor=#E9E9E9
| 406678 ||  || — || October 8, 2005 || Kitt Peak || Spacewatch || — || align=right | 2.2 km || 
|-id=679 bgcolor=#E9E9E9
| 406679 ||  || — || December 14, 2007 || Mount Lemmon || Mount Lemmon Survey || — || align=right | 1.1 km || 
|-id=680 bgcolor=#E9E9E9
| 406680 ||  || — || March 8, 2008 || Mount Lemmon || Mount Lemmon Survey || — || align=right | 1.1 km || 
|-id=681 bgcolor=#E9E9E9
| 406681 ||  || — || March 8, 2008 || Mount Lemmon || Mount Lemmon Survey || — || align=right | 2.0 km || 
|-id=682 bgcolor=#fefefe
| 406682 ||  || — || February 3, 2008 || Catalina || CSS || H || align=right data-sort-value="0.57" | 570 m || 
|-id=683 bgcolor=#E9E9E9
| 406683 ||  || — || March 10, 2008 || Mount Lemmon || Mount Lemmon Survey || — || align=right | 1.2 km || 
|-id=684 bgcolor=#E9E9E9
| 406684 ||  || — || March 12, 2008 || Kitt Peak || Spacewatch || (5) || align=right data-sort-value="0.70" | 700 m || 
|-id=685 bgcolor=#E9E9E9
| 406685 ||  || — || March 1, 2008 || Kitt Peak || Spacewatch || — || align=right | 1.2 km || 
|-id=686 bgcolor=#E9E9E9
| 406686 ||  || — || March 10, 2008 || Kitt Peak || Spacewatch || — || align=right | 1.9 km || 
|-id=687 bgcolor=#E9E9E9
| 406687 ||  || — || March 6, 2008 || Mount Lemmon || Mount Lemmon Survey || HNS || align=right | 1.1 km || 
|-id=688 bgcolor=#E9E9E9
| 406688 ||  || — || March 13, 2008 || Kitt Peak || Spacewatch || AGN || align=right data-sort-value="0.93" | 930 m || 
|-id=689 bgcolor=#E9E9E9
| 406689 ||  || — || March 1, 2008 || Kitt Peak || Spacewatch || — || align=right | 2.1 km || 
|-id=690 bgcolor=#fefefe
| 406690 ||  || — || March 5, 2008 || Mount Lemmon || Mount Lemmon Survey || H || align=right data-sort-value="0.53" | 530 m || 
|-id=691 bgcolor=#E9E9E9
| 406691 ||  || — || March 6, 2008 || Catalina || CSS || — || align=right | 1.8 km || 
|-id=692 bgcolor=#E9E9E9
| 406692 ||  || — || March 8, 2008 || Socorro || LINEAR || — || align=right | 1.2 km || 
|-id=693 bgcolor=#E9E9E9
| 406693 ||  || — || February 12, 2008 || Mount Lemmon || Mount Lemmon Survey || — || align=right | 1.5 km || 
|-id=694 bgcolor=#E9E9E9
| 406694 ||  || — || March 26, 2008 || Mount Lemmon || Mount Lemmon Survey || — || align=right | 1.8 km || 
|-id=695 bgcolor=#E9E9E9
| 406695 ||  || — || December 5, 2002 || Socorro || LINEAR || — || align=right | 2.3 km || 
|-id=696 bgcolor=#E9E9E9
| 406696 ||  || — || March 25, 2008 || Kitt Peak || Spacewatch || — || align=right | 1.3 km || 
|-id=697 bgcolor=#E9E9E9
| 406697 ||  || — || March 26, 2008 || Kitt Peak || Spacewatch || NEM || align=right | 2.0 km || 
|-id=698 bgcolor=#E9E9E9
| 406698 ||  || — || March 26, 2008 || Mount Lemmon || Mount Lemmon Survey || — || align=right | 2.1 km || 
|-id=699 bgcolor=#E9E9E9
| 406699 ||  || — || March 11, 2008 || Catalina || CSS || — || align=right | 1.0 km || 
|-id=700 bgcolor=#E9E9E9
| 406700 ||  || — || March 10, 2008 || Mount Lemmon || Mount Lemmon Survey || — || align=right | 1.6 km || 
|}

406701–406800 

|-bgcolor=#E9E9E9
| 406701 ||  || — || March 27, 2008 || Kitt Peak || Spacewatch || HOF || align=right | 2.9 km || 
|-id=702 bgcolor=#E9E9E9
| 406702 ||  || — || March 10, 2008 || Mount Lemmon || Mount Lemmon Survey || — || align=right | 2.5 km || 
|-id=703 bgcolor=#E9E9E9
| 406703 ||  || — || March 27, 2008 || Kitt Peak || Spacewatch || — || align=right | 2.1 km || 
|-id=704 bgcolor=#E9E9E9
| 406704 ||  || — || March 27, 2008 || Kitt Peak || Spacewatch || — || align=right | 1.9 km || 
|-id=705 bgcolor=#E9E9E9
| 406705 ||  || — || March 28, 2008 || Kitt Peak || Spacewatch || — || align=right | 1.8 km || 
|-id=706 bgcolor=#E9E9E9
| 406706 ||  || — || March 10, 2008 || Kitt Peak || Spacewatch || — || align=right | 2.2 km || 
|-id=707 bgcolor=#E9E9E9
| 406707 ||  || — || March 10, 2008 || Kitt Peak || Spacewatch || — || align=right | 2.1 km || 
|-id=708 bgcolor=#E9E9E9
| 406708 ||  || — || March 28, 2008 || Mount Lemmon || Mount Lemmon Survey || EUN || align=right | 1.4 km || 
|-id=709 bgcolor=#E9E9E9
| 406709 ||  || — || March 28, 2008 || Mount Lemmon || Mount Lemmon Survey || — || align=right | 1.5 km || 
|-id=710 bgcolor=#E9E9E9
| 406710 ||  || — || March 28, 2008 || Mount Lemmon || Mount Lemmon Survey || — || align=right | 2.1 km || 
|-id=711 bgcolor=#E9E9E9
| 406711 ||  || — || March 31, 2008 || Farra d'Isonzo || Farra d'Isonzo || 526 || align=right | 3.1 km || 
|-id=712 bgcolor=#d6d6d6
| 406712 ||  || — || March 15, 2008 || Mount Lemmon || Mount Lemmon Survey || — || align=right | 2.0 km || 
|-id=713 bgcolor=#E9E9E9
| 406713 ||  || — || March 30, 2008 || Kitt Peak || Spacewatch || — || align=right | 1.4 km || 
|-id=714 bgcolor=#E9E9E9
| 406714 ||  || — || March 31, 2008 || Kitt Peak || Spacewatch || — || align=right | 2.6 km || 
|-id=715 bgcolor=#E9E9E9
| 406715 ||  || — || March 31, 2008 || Mount Lemmon || Mount Lemmon Survey || AGN || align=right | 1.1 km || 
|-id=716 bgcolor=#d6d6d6
| 406716 ||  || — || March 28, 2008 || Kitt Peak || Spacewatch || — || align=right | 2.1 km || 
|-id=717 bgcolor=#E9E9E9
| 406717 ||  || — || March 29, 2008 || Kitt Peak || Spacewatch || — || align=right | 2.0 km || 
|-id=718 bgcolor=#E9E9E9
| 406718 ||  || — || April 3, 2008 || Mount Lemmon || Mount Lemmon Survey || — || align=right | 1.2 km || 
|-id=719 bgcolor=#E9E9E9
| 406719 ||  || — || November 23, 2006 || Kitt Peak || Spacewatch || — || align=right | 1.2 km || 
|-id=720 bgcolor=#E9E9E9
| 406720 ||  || — || March 27, 2008 || Kitt Peak || Spacewatch || — || align=right | 1.5 km || 
|-id=721 bgcolor=#d6d6d6
| 406721 ||  || — || April 1, 2008 || Mount Lemmon || Mount Lemmon Survey || — || align=right | 2.2 km || 
|-id=722 bgcolor=#E9E9E9
| 406722 ||  || — || April 3, 2008 || Mount Lemmon || Mount Lemmon Survey || — || align=right | 1.3 km || 
|-id=723 bgcolor=#E9E9E9
| 406723 ||  || — || March 5, 2008 || Kitt Peak || Spacewatch || — || align=right | 1.8 km || 
|-id=724 bgcolor=#E9E9E9
| 406724 ||  || — || January 17, 2007 || Kitt Peak || Spacewatch || AGN || align=right | 1.3 km || 
|-id=725 bgcolor=#d6d6d6
| 406725 ||  || — || April 4, 2008 || Kitt Peak || Spacewatch || — || align=right | 2.6 km || 
|-id=726 bgcolor=#E9E9E9
| 406726 ||  || — || March 13, 2008 || Kitt Peak || Spacewatch || — || align=right | 1.7 km || 
|-id=727 bgcolor=#E9E9E9
| 406727 ||  || — || March 28, 2008 || Mount Lemmon || Mount Lemmon Survey || WIT || align=right data-sort-value="0.98" | 980 m || 
|-id=728 bgcolor=#d6d6d6
| 406728 ||  || — || April 7, 2003 || Kitt Peak || Spacewatch || — || align=right | 2.2 km || 
|-id=729 bgcolor=#E9E9E9
| 406729 ||  || — || April 7, 2008 || Kitt Peak || Spacewatch || — || align=right | 2.5 km || 
|-id=730 bgcolor=#E9E9E9
| 406730 ||  || — || April 5, 2008 || Mount Lemmon || Mount Lemmon Survey || — || align=right | 1.8 km || 
|-id=731 bgcolor=#E9E9E9
| 406731 ||  || — || April 5, 2008 || Catalina || CSS || JUN || align=right | 1.2 km || 
|-id=732 bgcolor=#C2FFFF
| 406732 ||  || — || April 10, 2008 || Kitt Peak || Spacewatch || L5 || align=right | 12 km || 
|-id=733 bgcolor=#E9E9E9
| 406733 ||  || — || April 11, 2008 || Mount Lemmon || Mount Lemmon Survey || — || align=right | 2.4 km || 
|-id=734 bgcolor=#E9E9E9
| 406734 ||  || — || October 9, 2005 || Kitt Peak || Spacewatch || AGN || align=right | 1.2 km || 
|-id=735 bgcolor=#d6d6d6
| 406735 ||  || — || April 1, 2008 || Mount Lemmon || Mount Lemmon Survey || — || align=right | 2.5 km || 
|-id=736 bgcolor=#E9E9E9
| 406736 ||  || — || April 1, 2008 || Mount Lemmon || Mount Lemmon Survey || — || align=right | 2.7 km || 
|-id=737 bgcolor=#E9E9E9
| 406737 Davet ||  ||  || April 25, 2008 || Vicques || M. Ory || GEF || align=right | 1.2 km || 
|-id=738 bgcolor=#d6d6d6
| 406738 ||  || — || April 4, 2008 || Catalina || CSS || EUP || align=right | 4.6 km || 
|-id=739 bgcolor=#E9E9E9
| 406739 ||  || — || March 29, 2008 || Catalina || CSS || HNS || align=right | 1.3 km || 
|-id=740 bgcolor=#E9E9E9
| 406740 ||  || — || March 13, 2008 || Kitt Peak || Spacewatch || — || align=right | 2.2 km || 
|-id=741 bgcolor=#E9E9E9
| 406741 ||  || — || April 27, 2008 || Kitt Peak || Spacewatch || AGN || align=right | 1.3 km || 
|-id=742 bgcolor=#d6d6d6
| 406742 ||  || — || April 27, 2008 || Kitt Peak || Spacewatch || — || align=right | 2.4 km || 
|-id=743 bgcolor=#E9E9E9
| 406743 ||  || — || April 14, 2008 || Kitt Peak || Spacewatch || — || align=right | 1.0 km || 
|-id=744 bgcolor=#d6d6d6
| 406744 ||  || — || April 14, 2008 || Catalina || CSS || — || align=right | 3.6 km || 
|-id=745 bgcolor=#d6d6d6
| 406745 ||  || — || April 25, 2008 || Kitt Peak || Spacewatch || — || align=right | 3.0 km || 
|-id=746 bgcolor=#d6d6d6
| 406746 ||  || — || April 25, 2008 || Kitt Peak || Spacewatch || — || align=right | 2.7 km || 
|-id=747 bgcolor=#d6d6d6
| 406747 ||  || — || April 29, 2008 || Kitt Peak || Spacewatch || — || align=right | 2.0 km || 
|-id=748 bgcolor=#d6d6d6
| 406748 ||  || — || May 1, 2008 || Kitt Peak || Spacewatch || — || align=right | 2.0 km || 
|-id=749 bgcolor=#d6d6d6
| 406749 ||  || — || May 3, 2008 || Kitt Peak || Spacewatch || — || align=right | 2.3 km || 
|-id=750 bgcolor=#d6d6d6
| 406750 ||  || — || May 3, 2008 || Kitt Peak || Spacewatch || ELF || align=right | 4.3 km || 
|-id=751 bgcolor=#d6d6d6
| 406751 ||  || — || December 5, 2005 || Kitt Peak || Spacewatch || EOS || align=right | 1.7 km || 
|-id=752 bgcolor=#d6d6d6
| 406752 ||  || — || May 6, 2008 || Kitt Peak || Spacewatch || — || align=right | 2.7 km || 
|-id=753 bgcolor=#d6d6d6
| 406753 ||  || — || May 8, 2008 || Kitt Peak || Spacewatch || — || align=right | 2.3 km || 
|-id=754 bgcolor=#E9E9E9
| 406754 ||  || — || May 8, 2008 || Kitt Peak || Spacewatch || — || align=right | 1.8 km || 
|-id=755 bgcolor=#d6d6d6
| 406755 ||  || — || May 13, 2008 || Mount Lemmon || Mount Lemmon Survey || — || align=right | 2.8 km || 
|-id=756 bgcolor=#d6d6d6
| 406756 ||  || — || May 11, 2008 || Kitt Peak || Spacewatch || — || align=right | 2.5 km || 
|-id=757 bgcolor=#d6d6d6
| 406757 ||  || — || May 15, 2008 || Kitt Peak || Spacewatch || — || align=right | 2.9 km || 
|-id=758 bgcolor=#d6d6d6
| 406758 ||  || — || May 6, 2008 || Mount Lemmon || Mount Lemmon Survey || EOS || align=right | 1.9 km || 
|-id=759 bgcolor=#d6d6d6
| 406759 ||  || — || May 15, 2008 || Kitt Peak || Spacewatch || — || align=right | 2.5 km || 
|-id=760 bgcolor=#d6d6d6
| 406760 ||  || — || May 26, 2008 || Kitt Peak || Spacewatch || — || align=right | 3.2 km || 
|-id=761 bgcolor=#d6d6d6
| 406761 ||  || — || May 26, 2008 || Kitt Peak || Spacewatch || — || align=right | 2.9 km || 
|-id=762 bgcolor=#d6d6d6
| 406762 ||  || — || May 27, 2008 || Kitt Peak || Spacewatch || — || align=right | 2.0 km || 
|-id=763 bgcolor=#d6d6d6
| 406763 ||  || — || April 24, 2008 || Kitt Peak || Spacewatch || — || align=right | 2.3 km || 
|-id=764 bgcolor=#d6d6d6
| 406764 ||  || — || May 14, 2008 || Kitt Peak || Spacewatch || NAE || align=right | 2.5 km || 
|-id=765 bgcolor=#d6d6d6
| 406765 ||  || — || May 27, 2008 || Mount Lemmon || Mount Lemmon Survey || — || align=right | 2.2 km || 
|-id=766 bgcolor=#d6d6d6
| 406766 ||  || — || May 29, 2008 || Kitt Peak || Spacewatch || — || align=right | 2.8 km || 
|-id=767 bgcolor=#d6d6d6
| 406767 ||  || — || May 29, 2008 || Kitt Peak || Spacewatch || — || align=right | 2.8 km || 
|-id=768 bgcolor=#d6d6d6
| 406768 ||  || — || January 7, 2000 || Kitt Peak || Spacewatch || — || align=right | 4.0 km || 
|-id=769 bgcolor=#d6d6d6
| 406769 ||  || — || April 14, 2008 || Mount Lemmon || Mount Lemmon Survey || EOS || align=right | 2.0 km || 
|-id=770 bgcolor=#d6d6d6
| 406770 || 2008 OJ || — || July 25, 2008 || La Sagra || OAM Obs. || Tj (2.98) || align=right | 4.6 km || 
|-id=771 bgcolor=#d6d6d6
| 406771 ||  || — || July 30, 2008 || Catalina || CSS || THB || align=right | 4.7 km || 
|-id=772 bgcolor=#d6d6d6
| 406772 ||  || — || July 30, 2008 || Kitt Peak || Spacewatch || — || align=right | 3.0 km || 
|-id=773 bgcolor=#d6d6d6
| 406773 ||  || — || July 26, 2008 || Siding Spring || SSS || Tj (2.97) || align=right | 4.4 km || 
|-id=774 bgcolor=#d6d6d6
| 406774 ||  || — || July 30, 2008 || Kitt Peak || Spacewatch || — || align=right | 2.9 km || 
|-id=775 bgcolor=#d6d6d6
| 406775 ||  || — || August 3, 2008 || La Sagra || OAM Obs. || EUP || align=right | 6.2 km || 
|-id=776 bgcolor=#d6d6d6
| 406776 ||  || — || August 3, 2008 || Siding Spring || SSS || Tj (2.98) || align=right | 5.4 km || 
|-id=777 bgcolor=#d6d6d6
| 406777 ||  || — || August 24, 2008 || La Sagra || OAM Obs. || — || align=right | 3.1 km || 
|-id=778 bgcolor=#d6d6d6
| 406778 ||  || — || August 24, 2008 || Socorro || LINEAR || — || align=right | 3.7 km || 
|-id=779 bgcolor=#d6d6d6
| 406779 ||  || — || August 26, 2008 || Socorro || LINEAR ||  || align=right | 3.3 km || 
|-id=780 bgcolor=#d6d6d6
| 406780 ||  || — || March 11, 2005 || Mount Lemmon || Mount Lemmon Survey || 7:4 || align=right | 4.2 km || 
|-id=781 bgcolor=#d6d6d6
| 406781 ||  || — || September 4, 2008 || Kitt Peak || Spacewatch || EOS || align=right | 2.0 km || 
|-id=782 bgcolor=#d6d6d6
| 406782 ||  || — || September 8, 2008 || Grove Creek || F. Tozzi || TIR || align=right | 4.5 km || 
|-id=783 bgcolor=#d6d6d6
| 406783 ||  || — || September 6, 2008 || Mount Lemmon || Mount Lemmon Survey || — || align=right | 4.2 km || 
|-id=784 bgcolor=#d6d6d6
| 406784 ||  || — || September 6, 2008 || Catalina || CSS || LIX || align=right | 3.7 km || 
|-id=785 bgcolor=#d6d6d6
| 406785 ||  || — || September 6, 2008 || Catalina || CSS || — || align=right | 3.9 km || 
|-id=786 bgcolor=#d6d6d6
| 406786 ||  || — || September 4, 2008 || Kitt Peak || Spacewatch || (895) || align=right | 4.6 km || 
|-id=787 bgcolor=#d6d6d6
| 406787 ||  || — || September 2, 2008 || Kitt Peak || Spacewatch || — || align=right | 3.0 km || 
|-id=788 bgcolor=#d6d6d6
| 406788 ||  || — || September 6, 2008 || Catalina || CSS || — || align=right | 4.4 km || 
|-id=789 bgcolor=#d6d6d6
| 406789 ||  || — || September 7, 2008 || Mount Lemmon || Mount Lemmon Survey || — || align=right | 3.0 km || 
|-id=790 bgcolor=#d6d6d6
| 406790 ||  || — || September 21, 2008 || Kitt Peak || Spacewatch || — || align=right | 4.3 km || 
|-id=791 bgcolor=#fefefe
| 406791 ||  || — || September 21, 2008 || Kitt Peak || Spacewatch || — || align=right data-sort-value="0.44" | 440 m || 
|-id=792 bgcolor=#fefefe
| 406792 ||  || — || September 24, 2008 || Mount Lemmon || Mount Lemmon Survey || — || align=right data-sort-value="0.58" | 580 m || 
|-id=793 bgcolor=#d6d6d6
| 406793 ||  || — || September 22, 2008 || Kitt Peak || Spacewatch || Tj (2.99) || align=right | 4.1 km || 
|-id=794 bgcolor=#d6d6d6
| 406794 ||  || — || October 2, 2008 || Catalina || CSS || HYG || align=right | 3.3 km || 
|-id=795 bgcolor=#fefefe
| 406795 ||  || — || October 2, 2008 || Kitt Peak || Spacewatch || — || align=right data-sort-value="0.60" | 600 m || 
|-id=796 bgcolor=#d6d6d6
| 406796 ||  || — || October 2, 2008 || Kitt Peak || Spacewatch || 7:4 || align=right | 3.4 km || 
|-id=797 bgcolor=#d6d6d6
| 406797 ||  || — || September 2, 2008 || Kitt Peak || Spacewatch || 7:4 || align=right | 3.3 km || 
|-id=798 bgcolor=#d6d6d6
| 406798 ||  || — || October 6, 2008 || Socorro || LINEAR || — || align=right | 5.4 km || 
|-id=799 bgcolor=#d6d6d6
| 406799 ||  || — || October 17, 2008 || Kitt Peak || Spacewatch || — || align=right | 3.1 km || 
|-id=800 bgcolor=#d6d6d6
| 406800 ||  || — || October 20, 2008 || Kitt Peak || Spacewatch || 7:4 || align=right | 2.6 km || 
|}

406801–406900 

|-bgcolor=#fefefe
| 406801 ||  || — || October 20, 2008 || Kitt Peak || Spacewatch || — || align=right data-sort-value="0.55" | 550 m || 
|-id=802 bgcolor=#fefefe
| 406802 ||  || — || July 29, 2008 || Mount Lemmon || Mount Lemmon Survey || — || align=right data-sort-value="0.75" | 750 m || 
|-id=803 bgcolor=#B88A00
| 406803 ||  || — || October 21, 2008 || Kitt Peak || Spacewatch || Tj (2.94) || align=right | 3.0 km || 
|-id=804 bgcolor=#fefefe
| 406804 ||  || — || October 21, 2008 || Kitt Peak || Spacewatch || — || align=right data-sort-value="0.58" | 580 m || 
|-id=805 bgcolor=#fefefe
| 406805 ||  || — || October 22, 2008 || Kitt Peak || Spacewatch || — || align=right data-sort-value="0.66" | 660 m || 
|-id=806 bgcolor=#fefefe
| 406806 ||  || — || October 22, 2008 || Kitt Peak || Spacewatch || — || align=right data-sort-value="0.89" | 890 m || 
|-id=807 bgcolor=#fefefe
| 406807 ||  || — || October 23, 2008 || Kitt Peak || Spacewatch || — || align=right data-sort-value="0.60" | 600 m || 
|-id=808 bgcolor=#d6d6d6
| 406808 ||  || — || September 22, 2008 || Mount Lemmon || Mount Lemmon Survey || — || align=right | 2.9 km || 
|-id=809 bgcolor=#fefefe
| 406809 ||  || — || October 23, 2008 || Kitt Peak || Spacewatch || — || align=right data-sort-value="0.66" | 660 m || 
|-id=810 bgcolor=#fefefe
| 406810 ||  || — || October 26, 2008 || Kitt Peak || Spacewatch || — || align=right data-sort-value="0.76" | 760 m || 
|-id=811 bgcolor=#d6d6d6
| 406811 ||  || — || October 29, 2008 || Mount Lemmon || Mount Lemmon Survey || 7:4 || align=right | 5.0 km || 
|-id=812 bgcolor=#fefefe
| 406812 ||  || — || October 31, 2008 || Kitt Peak || Spacewatch || — || align=right data-sort-value="0.69" | 690 m || 
|-id=813 bgcolor=#FA8072
| 406813 ||  || — || September 27, 2008 || Mount Lemmon || Mount Lemmon Survey || — || align=right data-sort-value="0.27" | 270 m || 
|-id=814 bgcolor=#fefefe
| 406814 ||  || — || November 19, 2008 || Kitt Peak || Spacewatch || — || align=right data-sort-value="0.52" | 520 m || 
|-id=815 bgcolor=#fefefe
| 406815 ||  || — || November 18, 2008 || Kitt Peak || Spacewatch || — || align=right data-sort-value="0.74" | 740 m || 
|-id=816 bgcolor=#fefefe
| 406816 ||  || — || November 19, 2008 || Mount Lemmon || Mount Lemmon Survey || — || align=right data-sort-value="0.73" | 730 m || 
|-id=817 bgcolor=#fefefe
| 406817 ||  || — || November 30, 2008 || Mount Lemmon || Mount Lemmon Survey || — || align=right data-sort-value="0.63" | 630 m || 
|-id=818 bgcolor=#fefefe
| 406818 ||  || — || November 30, 2008 || Catalina || CSS || — || align=right data-sort-value="0.76" | 760 m || 
|-id=819 bgcolor=#fefefe
| 406819 ||  || — || November 24, 2008 || Mount Lemmon || Mount Lemmon Survey || — || align=right | 1.2 km || 
|-id=820 bgcolor=#d6d6d6
| 406820 ||  || — || December 2, 2008 || Sandlot || G. Hug || EUP || align=right | 6.0 km || 
|-id=821 bgcolor=#fefefe
| 406821 ||  || — || November 19, 2008 || Mount Lemmon || Mount Lemmon Survey || — || align=right data-sort-value="0.48" | 480 m || 
|-id=822 bgcolor=#fefefe
| 406822 ||  || — || October 30, 2008 || Mount Lemmon || Mount Lemmon Survey || — || align=right data-sort-value="0.96" | 960 m || 
|-id=823 bgcolor=#fefefe
| 406823 ||  || — || December 21, 2008 || Mount Lemmon || Mount Lemmon Survey || — || align=right data-sort-value="0.84" | 840 m || 
|-id=824 bgcolor=#fefefe
| 406824 ||  || — || December 21, 2008 || Mount Lemmon || Mount Lemmon Survey || — || align=right data-sort-value="0.75" | 750 m || 
|-id=825 bgcolor=#fefefe
| 406825 ||  || — || December 21, 2008 || Mount Lemmon || Mount Lemmon Survey || — || align=right data-sort-value="0.77" | 770 m || 
|-id=826 bgcolor=#fefefe
| 406826 ||  || — || December 30, 2008 || Mount Lemmon || Mount Lemmon Survey || — || align=right data-sort-value="0.61" | 610 m || 
|-id=827 bgcolor=#fefefe
| 406827 ||  || — || December 29, 2008 || Mount Lemmon || Mount Lemmon Survey || — || align=right data-sort-value="0.59" | 590 m || 
|-id=828 bgcolor=#fefefe
| 406828 ||  || — || December 29, 2008 || Kitt Peak || Spacewatch || — || align=right data-sort-value="0.70" | 700 m || 
|-id=829 bgcolor=#fefefe
| 406829 ||  || — || December 29, 2008 || Kitt Peak || Spacewatch || — || align=right data-sort-value="0.75" | 750 m || 
|-id=830 bgcolor=#fefefe
| 406830 ||  || — || December 21, 2008 || Mount Lemmon || Mount Lemmon Survey || V || align=right data-sort-value="0.79" | 790 m || 
|-id=831 bgcolor=#fefefe
| 406831 ||  || — || November 21, 2008 || Mount Lemmon || Mount Lemmon Survey || — || align=right data-sort-value="0.79" | 790 m || 
|-id=832 bgcolor=#fefefe
| 406832 ||  || — || December 29, 2008 || Kitt Peak || Spacewatch || — || align=right data-sort-value="0.82" | 820 m || 
|-id=833 bgcolor=#fefefe
| 406833 ||  || — || December 22, 2008 || Kitt Peak || Spacewatch || MAS || align=right data-sort-value="0.69" | 690 m || 
|-id=834 bgcolor=#fefefe
| 406834 ||  || — || December 4, 2008 || Mount Lemmon || Mount Lemmon Survey || — || align=right data-sort-value="0.81" | 810 m || 
|-id=835 bgcolor=#fefefe
| 406835 ||  || — || December 22, 2008 || Kitt Peak || Spacewatch || — || align=right data-sort-value="0.75" | 750 m || 
|-id=836 bgcolor=#fefefe
| 406836 ||  || — || December 22, 2008 || Kitt Peak || Spacewatch || — || align=right data-sort-value="0.84" | 840 m || 
|-id=837 bgcolor=#fefefe
| 406837 ||  || — || December 30, 2008 || Mount Lemmon || Mount Lemmon Survey || — || align=right data-sort-value="0.62" | 620 m || 
|-id=838 bgcolor=#fefefe
| 406838 ||  || — || January 2, 2009 || Dauban || F. Kugel || — || align=right data-sort-value="0.82" | 820 m || 
|-id=839 bgcolor=#fefefe
| 406839 ||  || — || January 2, 2009 || Mount Lemmon || Mount Lemmon Survey || — || align=right data-sort-value="0.60" | 600 m || 
|-id=840 bgcolor=#fefefe
| 406840 ||  || — || January 2, 2009 || Mount Lemmon || Mount Lemmon Survey || — || align=right data-sort-value="0.78" | 780 m || 
|-id=841 bgcolor=#fefefe
| 406841 ||  || — || January 15, 2009 || Kitt Peak || Spacewatch || — || align=right data-sort-value="0.91" | 910 m || 
|-id=842 bgcolor=#fefefe
| 406842 ||  || — || January 15, 2009 || Kitt Peak || Spacewatch || — || align=right | 1.7 km || 
|-id=843 bgcolor=#fefefe
| 406843 ||  || — || January 15, 2009 || Kitt Peak || Spacewatch || — || align=right data-sort-value="0.69" | 690 m || 
|-id=844 bgcolor=#fefefe
| 406844 ||  || — || January 2, 2009 || Kitt Peak || Spacewatch || — || align=right data-sort-value="0.72" | 720 m || 
|-id=845 bgcolor=#fefefe
| 406845 ||  || — || January 15, 2009 || Kitt Peak || Spacewatch || NYS || align=right data-sort-value="0.76" | 760 m || 
|-id=846 bgcolor=#fefefe
| 406846 ||  || — || January 19, 2009 || Socorro || LINEAR || — || align=right | 1.3 km || 
|-id=847 bgcolor=#fefefe
| 406847 ||  || — || December 29, 2008 || Kitt Peak || Spacewatch || — || align=right data-sort-value="0.79" | 790 m || 
|-id=848 bgcolor=#fefefe
| 406848 ||  || — || January 17, 2009 || Catalina || CSS || — || align=right data-sort-value="0.96" | 960 m || 
|-id=849 bgcolor=#E9E9E9
| 406849 ||  || — || January 18, 2009 || Mount Lemmon || Mount Lemmon Survey || — || align=right | 1.5 km || 
|-id=850 bgcolor=#fefefe
| 406850 ||  || — || January 2, 2009 || Mount Lemmon || Mount Lemmon Survey || NYS || align=right data-sort-value="0.76" | 760 m || 
|-id=851 bgcolor=#fefefe
| 406851 ||  || — || January 1, 2009 || Mount Lemmon || Mount Lemmon Survey || — || align=right data-sort-value="0.68" | 680 m || 
|-id=852 bgcolor=#fefefe
| 406852 ||  || — || January 16, 2009 || Kitt Peak || Spacewatch || — || align=right data-sort-value="0.91" | 910 m || 
|-id=853 bgcolor=#fefefe
| 406853 ||  || — || January 20, 2009 || Kitt Peak || Spacewatch || V || align=right data-sort-value="0.49" | 490 m || 
|-id=854 bgcolor=#fefefe
| 406854 ||  || — || January 20, 2009 || Kitt Peak || Spacewatch || V || align=right data-sort-value="0.56" | 560 m || 
|-id=855 bgcolor=#fefefe
| 406855 ||  || — || January 18, 2009 || Catalina || CSS || — || align=right data-sort-value="0.80" | 800 m || 
|-id=856 bgcolor=#fefefe
| 406856 ||  || — || November 1, 2007 || Mount Lemmon || Mount Lemmon Survey || MAS || align=right data-sort-value="0.79" | 790 m || 
|-id=857 bgcolor=#fefefe
| 406857 ||  || — || January 28, 2009 || Catalina || CSS || NYS || align=right data-sort-value="0.66" | 660 m || 
|-id=858 bgcolor=#fefefe
| 406858 ||  || — || January 29, 2009 || Kitt Peak || Spacewatch || — || align=right data-sort-value="0.53" | 530 m || 
|-id=859 bgcolor=#fefefe
| 406859 ||  || — || January 29, 2009 || Mount Lemmon || Mount Lemmon Survey || — || align=right data-sort-value="0.63" | 630 m || 
|-id=860 bgcolor=#fefefe
| 406860 ||  || — || January 31, 2009 || Mount Lemmon || Mount Lemmon Survey || — || align=right data-sort-value="0.71" | 710 m || 
|-id=861 bgcolor=#fefefe
| 406861 ||  || — || December 30, 2008 || Mount Lemmon || Mount Lemmon Survey || V || align=right data-sort-value="0.59" | 590 m || 
|-id=862 bgcolor=#fefefe
| 406862 ||  || — || January 29, 2009 || Kitt Peak || Spacewatch || MAS || align=right data-sort-value="0.66" | 660 m || 
|-id=863 bgcolor=#fefefe
| 406863 ||  || — || January 17, 2009 || Mount Lemmon || Mount Lemmon Survey || MAS || align=right data-sort-value="0.61" | 610 m || 
|-id=864 bgcolor=#fefefe
| 406864 ||  || — || January 29, 2009 || Kitt Peak || Spacewatch || — || align=right data-sort-value="0.90" | 900 m || 
|-id=865 bgcolor=#fefefe
| 406865 ||  || — || October 18, 2007 || Kitt Peak || Spacewatch || — || align=right data-sort-value="0.77" | 770 m || 
|-id=866 bgcolor=#fefefe
| 406866 ||  || — || December 21, 2008 || Mount Lemmon || Mount Lemmon Survey || — || align=right data-sort-value="0.98" | 980 m || 
|-id=867 bgcolor=#fefefe
| 406867 ||  || — || January 30, 2009 || Mount Lemmon || Mount Lemmon Survey || — || align=right data-sort-value="0.82" | 820 m || 
|-id=868 bgcolor=#fefefe
| 406868 ||  || — || January 16, 2009 || Kitt Peak || Spacewatch || — || align=right data-sort-value="0.80" | 800 m || 
|-id=869 bgcolor=#fefefe
| 406869 ||  || — || January 16, 2009 || Mount Lemmon || Mount Lemmon Survey || NYS || align=right data-sort-value="0.64" | 640 m || 
|-id=870 bgcolor=#fefefe
| 406870 ||  || — || January 18, 2009 || Kitt Peak || Spacewatch || NYS || align=right data-sort-value="0.65" | 650 m || 
|-id=871 bgcolor=#fefefe
| 406871 ||  || — || January 19, 2009 || Mount Lemmon || Mount Lemmon Survey || — || align=right data-sort-value="0.73" | 730 m || 
|-id=872 bgcolor=#fefefe
| 406872 ||  || — || January 20, 2009 || Kitt Peak || Spacewatch || — || align=right data-sort-value="0.86" | 860 m || 
|-id=873 bgcolor=#fefefe
| 406873 ||  || — || January 18, 2009 || Kitt Peak || Spacewatch || — || align=right | 1.2 km || 
|-id=874 bgcolor=#fefefe
| 406874 ||  || — || March 4, 2005 || Mount Lemmon || Mount Lemmon Survey || — || align=right data-sort-value="0.85" | 850 m || 
|-id=875 bgcolor=#fefefe
| 406875 ||  || — || January 26, 2009 || Catalina || CSS || — || align=right | 1.5 km || 
|-id=876 bgcolor=#fefefe
| 406876 ||  || — || February 1, 2009 || Mount Lemmon || Mount Lemmon Survey || V || align=right data-sort-value="0.73" | 730 m || 
|-id=877 bgcolor=#fefefe
| 406877 ||  || — || February 1, 2009 || Kitt Peak || Spacewatch || — || align=right data-sort-value="0.68" | 680 m || 
|-id=878 bgcolor=#E9E9E9
| 406878 ||  || — || February 1, 2009 || Kitt Peak || Spacewatch || — || align=right | 1.6 km || 
|-id=879 bgcolor=#fefefe
| 406879 ||  || — || February 1, 2009 || Kitt Peak || Spacewatch || MAS || align=right data-sort-value="0.80" | 800 m || 
|-id=880 bgcolor=#fefefe
| 406880 ||  || — || September 14, 2007 || Mount Lemmon || Mount Lemmon Survey || NYS || align=right data-sort-value="0.64" | 640 m || 
|-id=881 bgcolor=#fefefe
| 406881 ||  || — || February 5, 2009 || Kitt Peak || Spacewatch || — || align=right data-sort-value="0.91" | 910 m || 
|-id=882 bgcolor=#fefefe
| 406882 ||  || — || February 3, 2009 || Kitt Peak || Spacewatch || (2076) || align=right data-sort-value="0.68" | 680 m || 
|-id=883 bgcolor=#E9E9E9
| 406883 ||  || — || February 3, 2009 || Mount Lemmon || Mount Lemmon Survey || — || align=right data-sort-value="0.77" | 770 m || 
|-id=884 bgcolor=#fefefe
| 406884 ||  || — || February 4, 2009 || Mount Lemmon || Mount Lemmon Survey || V || align=right data-sort-value="0.72" | 720 m || 
|-id=885 bgcolor=#fefefe
| 406885 ||  || — || February 1, 2009 || Kitt Peak || Spacewatch || — || align=right data-sort-value="0.82" | 820 m || 
|-id=886 bgcolor=#fefefe
| 406886 ||  || — || February 4, 2009 || Mount Lemmon || Mount Lemmon Survey || — || align=right | 1.0 km || 
|-id=887 bgcolor=#E9E9E9
| 406887 ||  || — || February 16, 2009 || Kitt Peak || Spacewatch || critical || align=right | 1.2 km || 
|-id=888 bgcolor=#fefefe
| 406888 ||  || — || January 1, 2009 || Mount Lemmon || Mount Lemmon Survey || — || align=right data-sort-value="0.94" | 940 m || 
|-id=889 bgcolor=#fefefe
| 406889 ||  || — || February 18, 2009 || La Sagra || OAM Obs. || — || align=right | 1.0 km || 
|-id=890 bgcolor=#fefefe
| 406890 ||  || — || January 20, 2009 || Kitt Peak || Spacewatch || — || align=right data-sort-value="0.74" | 740 m || 
|-id=891 bgcolor=#fefefe
| 406891 ||  || — || February 19, 2009 || Kitt Peak || Spacewatch || — || align=right data-sort-value="0.99" | 990 m || 
|-id=892 bgcolor=#E9E9E9
| 406892 ||  || — || October 8, 1994 || Kitt Peak || Spacewatch || — || align=right | 1.1 km || 
|-id=893 bgcolor=#fefefe
| 406893 ||  || — || February 22, 2009 || Kitt Peak || Spacewatch || — || align=right data-sort-value="0.77" | 770 m || 
|-id=894 bgcolor=#fefefe
| 406894 ||  || — || February 22, 2009 || Mount Lemmon || Mount Lemmon Survey || — || align=right data-sort-value="0.74" | 740 m || 
|-id=895 bgcolor=#E9E9E9
| 406895 ||  || — || February 26, 2009 || Kitt Peak || Spacewatch || — || align=right data-sort-value="0.98" | 980 m || 
|-id=896 bgcolor=#fefefe
| 406896 ||  || — || February 24, 2009 || Kitt Peak || Spacewatch || — || align=right data-sort-value="0.83" | 830 m || 
|-id=897 bgcolor=#fefefe
| 406897 ||  || — || February 24, 2009 || Kitt Peak || Spacewatch || — || align=right data-sort-value="0.68" | 680 m || 
|-id=898 bgcolor=#fefefe
| 406898 ||  || — || February 27, 2009 || Kitt Peak || Spacewatch || — || align=right data-sort-value="0.78" | 780 m || 
|-id=899 bgcolor=#fefefe
| 406899 ||  || — || February 24, 2009 || Kitt Peak || Spacewatch || — || align=right data-sort-value="0.97" | 970 m || 
|-id=900 bgcolor=#fefefe
| 406900 ||  || — || February 19, 2009 || Kitt Peak || Spacewatch || — || align=right data-sort-value="0.74" | 740 m || 
|}

406901–407000 

|-bgcolor=#fefefe
| 406901 ||  || — || February 26, 2009 || Catalina || CSS || — || align=right data-sort-value="0.91" | 910 m || 
|-id=902 bgcolor=#fefefe
| 406902 ||  || — || January 31, 2009 || Mount Lemmon || Mount Lemmon Survey || — || align=right data-sort-value="0.51" | 510 m || 
|-id=903 bgcolor=#fefefe
| 406903 ||  || — || February 19, 2009 || Kitt Peak || Spacewatch || NYS || align=right data-sort-value="0.63" | 630 m || 
|-id=904 bgcolor=#E9E9E9
| 406904 ||  || — || February 19, 2009 || Kitt Peak || Spacewatch || — || align=right | 1.2 km || 
|-id=905 bgcolor=#fefefe
| 406905 ||  || — || April 15, 2005 || Kitt Peak || Spacewatch || — || align=right | 1.0 km || 
|-id=906 bgcolor=#fefefe
| 406906 ||  || — || March 4, 2005 || Mount Lemmon || Mount Lemmon Survey || — || align=right data-sort-value="0.69" | 690 m || 
|-id=907 bgcolor=#E9E9E9
| 406907 ||  || — || February 19, 2009 || Kitt Peak || Spacewatch || EUN || align=right | 1.6 km || 
|-id=908 bgcolor=#fefefe
| 406908 ||  || — || February 26, 2009 || Catalina || CSS || — || align=right data-sort-value="0.81" | 810 m || 
|-id=909 bgcolor=#E9E9E9
| 406909 ||  || — || February 13, 2009 || Kitt Peak || Spacewatch || — || align=right | 1.9 km || 
|-id=910 bgcolor=#fefefe
| 406910 ||  || — || March 1, 2009 || Mount Lemmon || Mount Lemmon Survey || — || align=right data-sort-value="0.80" | 800 m || 
|-id=911 bgcolor=#fefefe
| 406911 ||  || — || March 15, 2009 || La Sagra || OAM Obs. || V || align=right data-sort-value="0.71" | 710 m || 
|-id=912 bgcolor=#fefefe
| 406912 ||  || — || March 3, 2009 || Kitt Peak || Spacewatch || — || align=right data-sort-value="0.78" | 780 m || 
|-id=913 bgcolor=#fefefe
| 406913 ||  || — || March 1, 2009 || Mount Lemmon || Mount Lemmon Survey || — || align=right data-sort-value="0.94" | 940 m || 
|-id=914 bgcolor=#fefefe
| 406914 ||  || — || March 16, 2009 || Kitt Peak || Spacewatch || (2076) || align=right data-sort-value="0.57" | 570 m || 
|-id=915 bgcolor=#E9E9E9
| 406915 ||  || — || March 16, 2009 || Kitt Peak || Spacewatch || — || align=right | 1.0 km || 
|-id=916 bgcolor=#fefefe
| 406916 ||  || — || March 18, 2009 || Kitt Peak || Spacewatch || — || align=right data-sort-value="0.79" | 790 m || 
|-id=917 bgcolor=#fefefe
| 406917 ||  || — || March 17, 2009 || Kitt Peak || Spacewatch || V || align=right data-sort-value="0.65" | 650 m || 
|-id=918 bgcolor=#E9E9E9
| 406918 ||  || — || March 22, 2009 || Catalina || CSS || — || align=right | 3.2 km || 
|-id=919 bgcolor=#fefefe
| 406919 ||  || — || March 21, 2009 || Mount Lemmon || Mount Lemmon Survey || — || align=right data-sort-value="0.67" | 670 m || 
|-id=920 bgcolor=#fefefe
| 406920 ||  || — || March 25, 2009 || La Sagra || OAM Obs. || — || align=right data-sort-value="0.97" | 970 m || 
|-id=921 bgcolor=#fefefe
| 406921 ||  || — || March 28, 2009 || Kitt Peak || Spacewatch || — || align=right | 1.2 km || 
|-id=922 bgcolor=#fefefe
| 406922 ||  || — || March 18, 2009 || Mount Lemmon || Mount Lemmon Survey || — || align=right data-sort-value="0.73" | 730 m || 
|-id=923 bgcolor=#fefefe
| 406923 ||  || — || March 27, 2009 || Mount Lemmon || Mount Lemmon Survey || V || align=right data-sort-value="0.68" | 680 m || 
|-id=924 bgcolor=#E9E9E9
| 406924 ||  || — || March 23, 2009 || Siding Spring || SSS || — || align=right | 1.2 km || 
|-id=925 bgcolor=#E9E9E9
| 406925 ||  || — || March 29, 2009 || Kitt Peak || Spacewatch || — || align=right | 1.2 km || 
|-id=926 bgcolor=#fefefe
| 406926 ||  || — || March 19, 2009 || Mount Lemmon || Mount Lemmon Survey || — || align=right | 1.3 km || 
|-id=927 bgcolor=#E9E9E9
| 406927 ||  || — || March 19, 2009 || Mount Lemmon || Mount Lemmon Survey || — || align=right | 2.2 km || 
|-id=928 bgcolor=#fefefe
| 406928 ||  || — || April 2, 2009 || Kitt Peak || Spacewatch || — || align=right data-sort-value="0.83" | 830 m || 
|-id=929 bgcolor=#E9E9E9
| 406929 ||  || — || March 31, 2009 || Mount Lemmon || Mount Lemmon Survey || — || align=right | 1.3 km || 
|-id=930 bgcolor=#E9E9E9
| 406930 ||  || — || April 17, 2009 || Catalina || CSS || — || align=right | 1.1 km || 
|-id=931 bgcolor=#E9E9E9
| 406931 ||  || — || March 19, 2009 || Mount Lemmon || Mount Lemmon Survey || — || align=right | 1.9 km || 
|-id=932 bgcolor=#E9E9E9
| 406932 ||  || — || April 17, 2009 || Kitt Peak || Spacewatch || — || align=right data-sort-value="0.90" | 900 m || 
|-id=933 bgcolor=#fefefe
| 406933 ||  || — || April 18, 2009 || Kitt Peak || Spacewatch || — || align=right data-sort-value="0.83" | 830 m || 
|-id=934 bgcolor=#fefefe
| 406934 ||  || — || April 20, 2009 || Kitt Peak || Spacewatch || — || align=right | 1.1 km || 
|-id=935 bgcolor=#fefefe
| 406935 ||  || — || April 22, 2009 || Kitt Peak || Spacewatch || SUL || align=right | 2.4 km || 
|-id=936 bgcolor=#fefefe
| 406936 ||  || — || December 14, 2003 || Kitt Peak || Spacewatch || — || align=right | 1.0 km || 
|-id=937 bgcolor=#E9E9E9
| 406937 ||  || — || March 31, 2009 || Kitt Peak || Spacewatch || — || align=right | 1.3 km || 
|-id=938 bgcolor=#E9E9E9
| 406938 ||  || — || April 20, 2009 || Catalina || CSS || — || align=right | 4.0 km || 
|-id=939 bgcolor=#E9E9E9
| 406939 ||  || — || February 22, 2009 || Siding Spring || SSS || — || align=right | 1.7 km || 
|-id=940 bgcolor=#E9E9E9
| 406940 ||  || — || April 2, 2009 || Mount Lemmon || Mount Lemmon Survey || — || align=right | 1.9 km || 
|-id=941 bgcolor=#E9E9E9
| 406941 ||  || — || April 24, 2009 || Cerro Burek || Alianza S4 Obs. || — || align=right | 1.5 km || 
|-id=942 bgcolor=#E9E9E9
| 406942 ||  || — || April 20, 2009 || Kitt Peak || Spacewatch || RAF || align=right | 1.2 km || 
|-id=943 bgcolor=#E9E9E9
| 406943 ||  || — || April 23, 2009 || Kitt Peak || Spacewatch || — || align=right | 2.0 km || 
|-id=944 bgcolor=#E9E9E9
| 406944 ||  || — || November 14, 2007 || Mount Lemmon || Mount Lemmon Survey || EUN || align=right | 1.2 km || 
|-id=945 bgcolor=#E9E9E9
| 406945 ||  || — || April 19, 2009 || Catalina || CSS || — || align=right | 2.1 km || 
|-id=946 bgcolor=#E9E9E9
| 406946 ||  || — || April 20, 2009 || Catalina || CSS || EUN || align=right | 1.3 km || 
|-id=947 bgcolor=#fefefe
| 406947 ||  || — || September 25, 2006 || Catalina || CSS || — || align=right | 1.4 km || 
|-id=948 bgcolor=#E9E9E9
| 406948 ||  || — || November 11, 2007 || Mount Lemmon || Mount Lemmon Survey || — || align=right | 2.0 km || 
|-id=949 bgcolor=#E9E9E9
| 406949 ||  || — || April 20, 2009 || Kitt Peak || Spacewatch || — || align=right | 1.5 km || 
|-id=950 bgcolor=#E9E9E9
| 406950 ||  || — || March 31, 2009 || Mount Lemmon || Mount Lemmon Survey || — || align=right | 1.1 km || 
|-id=951 bgcolor=#E9E9E9
| 406951 ||  || — || May 15, 2009 || La Sagra || OAM Obs. || ADE || align=right | 2.6 km || 
|-id=952 bgcolor=#FFC2E0
| 406952 ||  || — || May 16, 2009 || Catalina || CSS || APO +1km || align=right data-sort-value="0.77" | 770 m || 
|-id=953 bgcolor=#E9E9E9
| 406953 ||  || — || May 26, 2009 || Kitt Peak || Spacewatch || — || align=right | 1.2 km || 
|-id=954 bgcolor=#E9E9E9
| 406954 ||  || — || June 22, 2009 || Kitt Peak || Spacewatch || JUN || align=right | 1.1 km || 
|-id=955 bgcolor=#E9E9E9
| 406955 ||  || — || October 31, 2005 || Mount Lemmon || Mount Lemmon Survey || — || align=right | 2.1 km || 
|-id=956 bgcolor=#E9E9E9
| 406956 ||  || — || December 15, 2006 || Kitt Peak || Spacewatch || — || align=right | 3.0 km || 
|-id=957 bgcolor=#E9E9E9
| 406957 Kochetova ||  ||  || July 21, 2009 || Zelenchukskaya || T. V. Kryachko || GEF || align=right | 1.8 km || 
|-id=958 bgcolor=#fefefe
| 406958 ||  || — || July 29, 2009 || Catalina || CSS || H || align=right data-sort-value="0.60" | 600 m || 
|-id=959 bgcolor=#E9E9E9
| 406959 ||  || — || July 28, 2009 || Kitt Peak || Spacewatch || — || align=right | 2.5 km || 
|-id=960 bgcolor=#E9E9E9
| 406960 ||  || — || July 27, 2009 || Kitt Peak || Spacewatch || — || align=right | 2.4 km || 
|-id=961 bgcolor=#d6d6d6
| 406961 ||  || — || February 23, 2007 || Mount Lemmon || Mount Lemmon Survey || — || align=right | 2.8 km || 
|-id=962 bgcolor=#d6d6d6
| 406962 ||  || — || May 28, 2008 || Kitt Peak || Spacewatch || — || align=right | 3.5 km || 
|-id=963 bgcolor=#d6d6d6
| 406963 ||  || — || August 15, 2009 || Kitt Peak || Spacewatch || — || align=right | 3.3 km || 
|-id=964 bgcolor=#d6d6d6
| 406964 ||  || — || August 15, 2009 || Kitt Peak || Spacewatch || KOR || align=right | 1.3 km || 
|-id=965 bgcolor=#d6d6d6
| 406965 ||  || — || August 16, 2009 || Kitt Peak || Spacewatch || EOS || align=right | 2.2 km || 
|-id=966 bgcolor=#d6d6d6
| 406966 ||  || — || August 16, 2009 || Catalina || CSS || EOS || align=right | 2.0 km || 
|-id=967 bgcolor=#d6d6d6
| 406967 ||  || — || August 16, 2009 || Kitt Peak || Spacewatch || EOS || align=right | 2.0 km || 
|-id=968 bgcolor=#d6d6d6
| 406968 ||  || — || August 16, 2009 || Kitt Peak || Spacewatch || EOS || align=right | 2.0 km || 
|-id=969 bgcolor=#d6d6d6
| 406969 ||  || — || August 16, 2009 || Kitt Peak || Spacewatch || LIX || align=right | 3.1 km || 
|-id=970 bgcolor=#d6d6d6
| 406970 ||  || — || August 20, 2009 || Kitt Peak || Spacewatch || EOS || align=right | 1.7 km || 
|-id=971 bgcolor=#E9E9E9
| 406971 ||  || — || August 26, 2009 || Catalina || CSS || — || align=right | 2.5 km || 
|-id=972 bgcolor=#d6d6d6
| 406972 ||  || — || September 22, 2004 || Anderson Mesa || LONEOS || EOS || align=right | 2.3 km || 
|-id=973 bgcolor=#d6d6d6
| 406973 ||  || — || August 29, 2009 || Kitt Peak || Spacewatch || — || align=right | 2.2 km || 
|-id=974 bgcolor=#d6d6d6
| 406974 ||  || — || August 18, 2009 || Kitt Peak || Spacewatch || KOR || align=right | 1.5 km || 
|-id=975 bgcolor=#d6d6d6
| 406975 ||  || — || August 27, 2009 || Kitt Peak || Spacewatch || — || align=right | 2.8 km || 
|-id=976 bgcolor=#d6d6d6
| 406976 ||  || — || August 17, 2009 || Kitt Peak || Spacewatch || — || align=right | 2.4 km || 
|-id=977 bgcolor=#d6d6d6
| 406977 ||  || — || August 20, 2009 || Kitt Peak || Spacewatch || EOS || align=right | 1.6 km || 
|-id=978 bgcolor=#d6d6d6
| 406978 ||  || — || August 27, 2009 || Kitt Peak || Spacewatch || — || align=right | 3.3 km || 
|-id=979 bgcolor=#d6d6d6
| 406979 ||  || — || August 28, 2009 || Kitt Peak || Spacewatch || — || align=right | 2.2 km || 
|-id=980 bgcolor=#d6d6d6
| 406980 ||  || — || August 28, 2009 || Socorro || LINEAR || ARM || align=right | 4.7 km || 
|-id=981 bgcolor=#d6d6d6
| 406981 ||  || — || August 27, 2009 || Kitt Peak || Spacewatch || EOS || align=right | 1.9 km || 
|-id=982 bgcolor=#d6d6d6
| 406982 ||  || — || December 7, 1999 || Socorro || LINEAR || EOS || align=right | 2.8 km || 
|-id=983 bgcolor=#E9E9E9
| 406983 ||  || — || September 14, 2009 || Haleakala || M. Micheli || — || align=right | 1.2 km || 
|-id=984 bgcolor=#d6d6d6
| 406984 ||  || — || September 12, 2009 || Kitt Peak || Spacewatch || — || align=right | 3.3 km || 
|-id=985 bgcolor=#d6d6d6
| 406985 ||  || — || September 12, 2009 || Kitt Peak || Spacewatch || VER || align=right | 2.6 km || 
|-id=986 bgcolor=#d6d6d6
| 406986 ||  || — || September 12, 2009 || Kitt Peak || Spacewatch || HYG || align=right | 2.6 km || 
|-id=987 bgcolor=#d6d6d6
| 406987 ||  || — || September 12, 2009 || Kitt Peak || Spacewatch || — || align=right | 2.5 km || 
|-id=988 bgcolor=#d6d6d6
| 406988 ||  || — || September 15, 2009 || Kitt Peak || Spacewatch || EOS || align=right | 4.2 km || 
|-id=989 bgcolor=#d6d6d6
| 406989 ||  || — || September 14, 2009 || Kitt Peak || Spacewatch || — || align=right | 3.0 km || 
|-id=990 bgcolor=#d6d6d6
| 406990 ||  || — || September 15, 2009 || Kitt Peak || Spacewatch || THM || align=right | 2.2 km || 
|-id=991 bgcolor=#d6d6d6
| 406991 ||  || — || September 15, 2009 || Kitt Peak || Spacewatch || — || align=right | 2.5 km || 
|-id=992 bgcolor=#d6d6d6
| 406992 ||  || — || September 15, 2009 || Kitt Peak || Spacewatch || — || align=right | 2.9 km || 
|-id=993 bgcolor=#d6d6d6
| 406993 ||  || — || September 15, 2009 || Kitt Peak || Spacewatch || — || align=right | 3.4 km || 
|-id=994 bgcolor=#d6d6d6
| 406994 ||  || — || September 15, 2009 || Kitt Peak || Spacewatch || — || align=right | 3.4 km || 
|-id=995 bgcolor=#d6d6d6
| 406995 ||  || — || January 29, 2000 || Kitt Peak || Spacewatch || — || align=right | 2.8 km || 
|-id=996 bgcolor=#d6d6d6
| 406996 ||  || — || September 15, 2009 || Kitt Peak || Spacewatch || EOS || align=right | 2.1 km || 
|-id=997 bgcolor=#d6d6d6
| 406997 ||  || — || September 15, 2009 || Kitt Peak || Spacewatch || — || align=right | 3.5 km || 
|-id=998 bgcolor=#d6d6d6
| 406998 ||  || — || September 15, 2009 || Kitt Peak || Spacewatch || — || align=right | 2.5 km || 
|-id=999 bgcolor=#d6d6d6
| 406999 ||  || — || September 18, 2003 || Kitt Peak || Spacewatch || — || align=right | 3.3 km || 
|-id=000 bgcolor=#d6d6d6
| 407000 ||  || — || September 15, 2009 || Kitt Peak || Spacewatch || — || align=right | 2.9 km || 
|}

References

External links 
 Discovery Circumstances: Numbered Minor Planets (405001)–(410000) (IAU Minor Planet Center)

0406